General Sir Hubert de la Poer Gough  (12 August 1870 – 18 March 1963) was a senior officer in the British Army in the First World War. A controversial figure, he was a favourite of the Commander-in-Chief of the British Expeditionary Force (BEF) on the Western Front, Field Marshal Sir Douglas Haig. He experienced a meteoric rise through the ranks during the war, ultimately rising to command the British Fifth Army from 1916 to 1918, including during the Battle of the Somme in 1916, the Battle of Passchendaele in 1917, and during the German spring offensives in 1918, in the aftermath of which he was relieved of his command.

Early life

Family background
The name of Gough probably derives from the Welsh word coch, meaning "red". Before leaving England Gough's ancestors were clerics and clerks in Wiltshire, and the family settled in Ireland in the early 17th century, not as planters but in clerical positions. By the nineteenth century they were an Anglo-Irish family of the landed gentry settled at Gurteen, County Waterford, Ireland. Gough described himself as "Irish by blood and upbringing".

Gough was the eldest son of General Sir Charles J. S. Gough, VC, GCB, a nephew of General Sir Hugh H. Gough, VC, and a brother of Brigadier General Sir John Edmund Gough, VC. The Goughs are the only family to have won the Victoria Cross, the highest British award for bravery, three times. Hubert's mother was Harriette Anastasia de la Poer, a daughter of John William Poer, styled 17th Baron de la Poer, of Gurteen, County Waterford, formerly member of parliament for the County Waterford constituency. Gough's mother was brought up as a Roman Catholic, although her mother was a Protestant.

Gough was born in London on 12 August 1870. As an infant Gough went out to India with his family late in 1870, and his brother John was born there in 1871, but in 1877 the boys and their mother were sent back to England, while their father was on active service in the Second Afghan War; a younger brother and sister died of scarlet fever at this time. Gough's mother returned to India when he was ten, leaving the boys at a boarding school, and Gough did not meet his father again until he was sixteen.

Early career
Gough attended Eton College, and according to his autobiography Soldiering On he was terrible at Latin. But he was good at sports such as football and rugby. After leaving Eton, Gough gained entrance to the Royal Military Academy, Sandhurst in 1888. He was gazetted into the 16th Lancers as a second lieutenant on 5 March 1889. Although not particularly wealthy compared to other cavalry officers – he had a parental allowance of £360 a year on top of his official salary of just over £121 – he distinguished himself as a rider, winning the Regimental Cup, and as a polo player. Many of his horses were provided for him by other officers.

Gough was promoted to lieutenant on 23 July 1890, and his regiment sailed for Bombay in September 1890, travelling by train to Lucknow. During the winter of 1893–94 he briefly acted in command of a squadron while other officers were on leave. He was promoted captain on 22 December 1894 at the relatively early age of 24.

He served with the Tirah Field Force 1897–98. He was posted to the Northwest Frontier, initially to the garrison holding the entrance to the Khyber Pass at Jamrud. His patron Colonel Neville Chamberlain managed to obtain for him a posting as assistant commissariat officer in Major-General Alfred Gaselee's brigade.

Gough returned to England in June 1898, and sat the Staff College exam in August. He was hospitalised with malaria in the autumn, then married Margaret Louisa Nora Lewes (known as "Daisy") on 22 December 1898 (postponed from April). He married at an unusually early age for a serving officer.

Boer War
Gough started at Staff College, Camberley on 9 January 1899 but did not complete the course. Instead he was ordered on special service to South Africa on 25 October 1899, steaming from Southampton on 28 October and reaching Cape Town on 15 November. He was deployed to Natal, and was initially ordered by Colonel Ian Hamilton to act as instructor to one of the Rifle Associations (locally raised units of volunteer mounted infantry or light cavalry).

Gough then served as ADC to Lord Dundonald, who was commanding mounted troops in Natal. In January 1900 he was promoted to brigade intelligence officer, a role which required a great deal of scouting. In mid-January he was sent to reconnoitre Potgeiter's Drift, a crossing of the Tugela River, with a view to outflanking the Boer position at Colenso – which Buller had assaulted in December – from the west in an attempt to relieve Ladysmith. However, slow deployment gave away the British intentions and allowed the Boers time to prepare their defence. During the resulting Battle of Spion Kop (23–24 January) Gough met Winston Churchill, then relaying messages while serving as an officer in the South African Light Horse.

On 1 February Gough was appointed, as a local unpaid major, CO of a Composite Regiment (a squadron of Imperial Light Horse, a squadron of Natal Carbineers and a company of 60th Rifles Mounted Infantry). He led his regiment to assist Buller's third attempt (5–7 February) to cross the Tugela, and in the fourth attempt (14–27 February). He led the first British troops into Ladysmith (28 February), in defiance of written orders from Dundonald that it was "too dangerous" to proceed, and there met his brother Johnnie who had been besieged inside the town. His meeting with George Stuart White was widely portrayed. In March 1900 the Composite Regiment was reorganised. Gough lost the Natal Carbineers and Imperial Light Horse Squadrons, but received in their place two companies of mounted infantry, one Scots and one Irish. He devoted a great deal of effort to training, both in riding and musketry. From May 1900 Gough's regiment saw active service as Buller pushed into the passes of the Drakenberg Mountains northwest of Ladysmith, eventually linking up with the main British forces under Lord Roberts. The conventional phase of the war ended towards the end of 1900.

During the period of guerrilla warfare which followed, Gough's Regiment was gradually reinforced to a strength of 600 men in four companies. Along with Smith-Dorrien and Allenby, he served under the overall command of Lieutenant-General French. Gough was marked for consideration for a brevet lieutenant-colonelcy in late April 1901, although this promotion was not to take effect until he became a substantive major in his own regiment. Major-General Smith-Dorrien wrote to Gough's father praising him and expressing a wish that he could be promoted straightaway. On 17 September 1901 he led the Composite Regiment, after inadequate reconnaissance, to attack what appeared a tempting target of Boers near Blood River Port, only to be taken prisoner with his entire force by larger Boer forces which had been out of sight. After he escaped, Kitchener (the commander-in-chief) expressed his "deepest sympathy", and he may have survived with his reputation largely intact because his overconfidence was in favourable contrast to the timidity which had contributed to other British defeats. To his credit, according to Gary Sheffield, Gough discussed the matter at length in his memoirs Soldiering On. Although preparations were made to restore the Composite Regiment to full strength, Gough was wounded in the right hand and arm in November, losing the tip of one finger. He was invalided home on the steamship Plassy in January 1902, and reverted to his substantive rank of captain.
He was mentioned in despatches four times (including the final despatch by Lord Kitchener dated 23 June 1902).

Edwardian era
After his return from South Africa he declined an offer of a place on the General Staff, hoping to return to active service in South Africa. However, he changed his mind after the Treaty of Vereeniging ended the war (31 May 1902), but there were no longer any vacancies at the War Office.

He returned as a regular captain in the 16th Lancers on 23 August 1902, but was back in a staff position the following month when he was appointed brigade major, 1st Cavalry Brigade at Aldershot on 24 September 1902 with promotion to the substantive rank of major on 22 October 1902. His brevet rank of lieutenant-colonel took effect the following day (23 October 1902). His duties included re-equipping regular units as they returned from South Africa. He enjoyed a poor relationship with his superior, Brigadier-General Scobell, who recorded that he had "a tedious habit of questioning regulations ... He has not learned to control his temper."

Gough was appointed an Instructor at Staff College on 1 January 1904 and served until 1906. He served under Henry Rawlinson as commandant, while the other instructors included his future colleagues Richard Haking, John du Cane, Thompson Capper and Launcelot Kiggell. At Staff College he was the first instructor to win the College point-to-point.

Gough was promoted brevet colonel on 11 June 1906 and substantive lieutenant-colonel on 18 July 1906. He was appointed CO of the 16th (Queen's) Lancers on 15 December 1907. When CO of his regiment Gough, based on his experience in South Africa, favoured cavalrymen using their initiative and riding in small groups, making maximum use of the ground as cover. Gough was still the youngest lieutenant-colonel in the Army. His superior at this point was Julian Byng, who recommended him for command of a brigade.

His period in command of the 16th Lancers now expired, he briefly went on half pay on 19 December 1910, still as a lieutenant-colonel and brevet colonel. On 1 January 1911 was granted the temporary rank of brigadier-general and appointed General Officer Commanding 3rd Cavalry Brigade, which included the 16th Lancers, at the Curragh.

At the 1913 Manoeuvres Gough moved his force unseen between the outposts of two divisions to attack the enemy centre, causing some of his seniors to think him "a trifle too sharp".

Curragh incident
Gough later wrote "all our relations were anti-Home Rulers." With Irish Home Rule due to become law in 1914, the Cabinet were contemplating some form of military action against the Ulster Volunteers who wanted no part of it. Gough was one of the leading officers who threatened to resign in the ensuing Curragh Incident.

The incident
On the morning of Friday 20 March, Arthur Paget (Commander-in-Chief, Ireland) addressed senior officers at his headquarters in Dublin. By Gough's account (in his memoirs Soldiering On), he said that "active operations were to commence against Ulster," that officers who lived in Ulster would be permitted to "disappear" for the duration, but that other officers who refused to serve against Ulster would be dismissed rather than being permitted to resign, and that Gough – who had a family connection with Ulster but did not live there – could expect no mercy from his "old friend at the War Office" (French). French, Paget and Ewart had in fact (on 19 March) agreed to exclude officers with "direct family connections" to Ulster. In offering his officers an ultimatum, Paget was acting foolishly, as the majority might have obeyed if simply ordered north. Paget ended the meeting by ordering his officers to speak to their subordinates and then report back. Maj-Gen Sir Charles Fergusson, GOC 5th Infantry Division, warned Gough and one of the infantry brigadiers that the Army must hold together at all costs, and that he himself would obey orders. Gough said that he would not, and went off to speak to the officers of the 5th Lancers (one of the regiments under his command) and also sent a telegram to his brother "Johnnie", Haig's Chief of Staff at Aldershot. Gough did not attend the second meeting in the afternoon, at which Paget confirmed that the purpose of the move was to overawe Ulster rather than fight.

Richard Holmes argues that Gough should have done what Fergusson did the following morning: assure his officers of his own unionist sympathies but urge them to obey orders. That evening Paget informed the War Office by telegram that 57 officers preferred to accept dismissal (it was actually 61 including Gough). Gough was suspended from duty and he and 2 of his 3 colonels (the attitude of the third was unclear) were summoned to the War Office to explain themselves. Chetwode, who was nominated to take Gough's place if necessary, described him as "hot-headed and very Irish".

The "Peccant paragraphs"
Gough sent a telegram to the elderly Field-Marshal Roberts (who had been lobbying the King and arguing with John French (CIGS) on the telephone), purporting to ask for advice, although possibly designed to goad him into further action. Roberts learned from an interview with Seely that Paget had exceeded his instructions (in talking of "active operations" against Ulster and in giving officers a chance to discuss hypothetical orders and threaten to resign) and left a note for Hubert Gough to this effect. With this news, Gough, accompanied by his brother (who had opened the note in error), confirmed to Ewart (on the morning of Sunday 22 March) that he would have obeyed a direct order to move against Ulster. French threatened to resign if Gough were not reinstated.

In another meeting at the War Office (23 March), Gough demanded a written guarantee from French and Ewart that the Army would not be used against Ulster (possibly influenced by Major-General Henry Wilson, who had recently suggested similar terms to J.E.B. Seely (Secretary of State for War), and with whom Gough had breakfasted that morning). At another meeting with Seely, who – by Gough's account – attempted unsuccessfully to browbeat Gough by staring at him, Seely accepted French's suggestion that a written document from the Army Council might help to convince Gough's officers. The Cabinet approved a text, stating that the Army Council were satisfied that the incident had been a misunderstanding, and that it was "the duty of all soldiers to obey lawful commands", to which Seely added two paragraphs, stating that the Government had the right to use the "forces of the Crown" in Ireland or elsewhere, but had no intention of using force "to crush opposition to the Home Rule Bill".

At another meeting after 4 pm Gough, on the advice of Henry Wilson (also present), insisted on adding a further paragraph clarifying that the Army would not be used to enforce Home Rule on Ulster, with which French concurred in writing. When H.H. Asquith (Prime Minister) learned of this he demanded that Gough return the document, which he refused to do. Asquith publicly repudiated the "peccant paragraphs" (25 March). French and Seely both had to resign.

First World War

Early war

Cavalry brigade: Mons to the Marne
At the outbreak of war in August 1914, Gough took the 3rd Cavalry Brigade to France, under the command of Allenby (GOC Cavalry Division). They embarked between 14 and 16 August, and shipped directly from Ireland to Le Havre, before travelling by train to Maubeuge. Active operations began on 21 August, and the brigade saw action on 22 August, on which day an artillery battery under Gough's command was the first British battery in France to open fire on the Germans. During the Battle of Mons (23 August) Gough's brigade, along with three of the other British cavalry brigades, was on the left flank (the 5th was on the right, maintaining contact with Lanrezac's Fifth Army).

During the following days Gough detached himself from Allenby's command and linked up with Haig's I Corps on the BEF's right. Gough's version of events was that he had become dissatisfied with Allenby on 24 August after his retreat exposed Fergusson’s 5th Infantry Division to German attack on its left flank, requiring 2nd Cavalry Brigade to mount a charge and Gough's 3rd Brigade, which was to have been the rearguard, to fight dismounted. After the Germans fell back, Gough was able to resume the planned retreat, only to find that Allenby had sent the division transport, containing food, ammunition and maps, far into the rear. Gough later claimed (in The Fifth Army) that Allenby had been "mesmerised" by the enemy during an engagement at Solesmes on 25 August. Gough may also have been panicking, telling another officer that the British were "surrounded" and that the Germans were already in Amiens – southwest of the BEF's present position. Allenby publicly laughed this episode off as "only Gough's little way" but was privately furious both at Gough's behaviour and at the way it was tolerated by French and Haig. Relations between Allenby and Gough were strained thereafter.

During the Battle of Le Cateau (26 August) part of Gough's brigade again assisted 5th Infantry Division. After the battle, lacking orders or information, he managed to make contact with Wilson (sub chief of staff, BEF) on the civilian telephone system, who told him – by Gough's account – "As you are on the spot, do as you like, old boy." On 27 August, near St Quentin, Gough managed to obtain some maps from an Army Service Corps officer who happened to be driving past, and managed – again using the civilian telephone system – to make contact with the corps commanders Haig and Smith-Dorrien. On 28 August he sent a message to GHQ stating that he had lost contact with Division HQ and had received no orders for 4 days, but although he asked for orders from GHQ he received none. On 29 August the brigade heard the artillery of the Battle of Guise in the far distance. By 1 September they were at Villers-Cotterêts, south of the Aisne, after a retreat of 180 miles (100 miles as the crow flies), and at last linked up with I Corps, assisting a rearguard of Irish Guards in the last major action of the retreat. The retreat ended south of the Marne on 5 September and Gough for the first time linked up with British transport and supplies.

By the time of the Battle of the Marne 3rd and 5th Cavalry Brigades had been formed into "Gough's Command", an ad hoc cavalry force separate from Allenby's Cavalry Division. One man wrote: "It was all push, push, push with Goughie. But he was pushing the enemy as much as he was pushing us." Gough advanced to the Aisne on 12 September, although owing to Sir John French's having failed to organise ad hoc advance guards there was neither artillery to harass the Germans nor engineers to repair the bridges, which had been blown only an hour previously.

Cavalry division

On 15 September Gough's Command, with the addition of supporting troops, was formed into 2nd Cavalry Division and he was appointed GOC on 16 September. The two cavalry divisions, now being redeployed by train to Belgium, were formed into a Cavalry Corps under Allenby (9 September), and reached the Belgian border on 11 September.

2nd Cavalry Division was the western flank of the BEF, and after capturing Mont des Cats (12 October) and after interviews with prisoners, Gough believed that he had a chance to turn the German west flank. He gave verbal orders (13 October) to capture Mount Kemmel (also southwest of Ypres) and to cross the Lys southeast of Ypres, but was forbidden to advance further by Allenby. The staff officer Philip Howell wrote to his wife at this time that Gough was "like a cat on hot bricks" (14 October 1914). On 14 October Gough linked up with Rawlinson's IV Corps (Byng's 3rd Cavalry Division and Capper's 7th Infantry Division) which were moving down from the coast – as there was no longer any danger of being cut off Gough ordered his division to advance, while Allenby (15 October) at last persuaded Sir John French to try to take Lille and turn the German west flank – instead they clashed with new forces being brought up by Falkenhayn.

On 16 and 17 October Gough's attempts to cross the Lys were beaten back by German forces Entrenchment began on 20 October – local workers had to be rounded up, as British cavalry were not equipped with entrenching tools. Gough's division, sometimes with as few as 2,000 officers and men in the front line, was defending an area around Messines and Wytschaete. At one point he had to gallop to the front lines to order certain regiments to hold their positions – this had been caused by confused staff work, in which Gough's orders to draw up "contingency plans" for retreat had been misunderstood.

Gough was promoted major-general on 26 October 1914. The promotion was backdated to 15 September, the date on which his division had been formed. During this period Gough formed the practice of rotating units through the front lines as quickly as possible, to avoid any single unit being damaged beyond the point of effectiveness, and of holding the front lines thinly to maintain the largest possible reserve. On 27 October Gough offered some of his reserves to Haig's I Corps (he made the offer privately to his brother Johnnie, Haig's chief of staff at the time), but this was countermanded by Allenby.

At 11.30am on 29 October Gough was able to send 5 squadrons out of his reserve to assist Byng's cavalry division. On 30 October, 31 October and the following night Gough's division (3,250 officers and men, assisted by two companies of Baluchis, Wilde's Rifles (an Indian battalion) and the London Scottish territorial battalion) was strongly attacked from the south-east by German forces under von Fabeck, who were trying to capture Messines-Wytschaete Ridge. He held off the assault, assisted by a cavalry charge by Chetwode's 5th Cavalry Brigade to his north and a counterattack by two battalions of Allenby's corps reserve to his south-west. He later reflected that he served his "apprenticeship in India and during the Boer War" but that at First Ypres "the Germans gave me my trade test."

Gough's Division returned to the front line at Hooge, near Ypres, on 12 February. On 13 February he was offered a command in the expedition intended for Salonika (in the event these troops were sent to Gallipoli) but declined after consulting his brother and BEF Chief of Staff "Wully" Robertson. Johnnie Gough was wounded and died later in February. Haig, a shy man, liked Gough for his wit and open personality, and to some extent he replaced his dead brother as Haig's confidant. Haig specifically asked (10 March 1915) for Gough to be attached to his forces in case he succeeded in "breaking the enemy line" at Neuve Chapelle (10–13 March). In the event, Gough's division was in GHQ Reserve for the battle. Philip Howell wrote to his wife that Gough liked "to fight with everyone above him as well as with the Boches" (19 March 1915).

Infantry division

Gough was appointed GOC of the 7th Division on 18 April 1915, after its previous commander, Thompson Capper, had been wounded. The division was part of Rawlinson's IV Corps, itself part of Haig's First Army; on giving him his new appointment, Haig informed him (Haig diary 18 April 1915) about how Rawlinson had attempted to have Joey Davies sacked from command of 8th Division after Neuve Chapelle and how Davies and his staff did not trust Rawlinson. Gough may have been appointed as a counterbalance to Rawlinson, with whom Haig had a wary relationship. Gough and his division were in reserve at Second Ypres (22 April).

Gough commanded 7th Division at the Battle of Aubers Ridge in May. 7th Division was in corps reserve on 9 May, and that night was ordered to relieve 8th Division in the line, ready to renew the attack the next day. After protests from the brigadiers that this was impractical (the support trenches were full of men – some alive, some wounded and some dead – while front line units were still reorganising and recovering their wounded) Gough cancelled the relief on his own authority as "the man on the spot". He expected to be disciplined by Rawlinson, but instead his division was redeployed to the sector of Monro's I Corps, where diversionary attacks were to be mounted to assist the French.

Monro gave Gough great leeway to plan his own attack after consulting with officers who had been involved in the attack on that sector on 9 May. Gough and his artillery officer "Curly" Birch devised a plan for a few minutes’ bombardment, leaving a gap to tempt the Germans out of their shelters (as a double bluff the bombardment was to be repeated several times in preceding days), while bringing some guns forward on muffled wheels to take the Germans by surprise. The assault began at 3:15 am on 16 May. The right of 7th Division (1st Royal Welch Fusiliers and 2nd Queens) was the only part of I Corps attack to succeed. The attack was renewed the next day after assistance from almost every First Army gun in range, but was unable to make much further progress. On 19 May 7th Division was withdrawn from the line, handing over its sector to the Canadian Division.

After Aubers Ridge a captain described Gough as "a little man, very smart and keen looking. He spent about 15 minutes with my company and spoke very easily to the soldiers ... he made us all laugh at the end and feel very cheery."

At the end of June Gough returned home and was awarded the CB for his services in August and September 1914.

Corps commander: Loos

Planning
With Capper now recovered and keen to resume command of 7th Division, and Monro being promoted to command the new Third Army, Gough was appointed GOC I Corps (2nd, 7th and later also 9th Division), still part of Haig's First Army, and promoted temporary lieutenant-general on 13 July 1915. Gough's practice of visiting front-line units irritated Horne of 2nd Division and Capper, who felt that this was a threat to his own renewed authority over 7th Division.

Gough, along with the other corps commanders of First Army, was present at a meeting with Kitchener on 19 August. After Kitchener had argued that there would be enough "exceptions" to make conscription administratively difficult, Gough, by his own account, "flared up" and declared that it was needed, while Haig urged Kitchener to put his weight behind its introduction (Haig omitted the latter points from his own diary account of the meeting).

At a meeting with his corps commanders (13 August) Haig asked Gough to draw up plans to take the Hohenzollern Redoubt, while Rawlinson was to take Loos and possibly Hill 70. Gough (22 August) proposed that 9th Scottish Division should "rush" the German positions on his left (Hohenzollern Redoubt, Fosse 8) just before dawn (4 am) after a barrage and gas attack, while the following night 7th Division would push through the Quarries to Citie St Elie. Haig recorded (1 September 1915) how "active and energetic" Gough and the artillery officer Noel Birch were, and insisted that Rawlinson (who proposed a limited stage-by-stage operation) also use gas for his initial attack. Gough would later (The Fifth Army p. 101) call gas "a boomerang ally" Gough later wrote that he had been dismayed at the lack of guns and ammunition. Neither Gough nor Rawlinson's corps had any reserve – in Gough's case only one brigade from each of his three divisions.

Haig met Rawlinson and Gough again (16 September) and ordered them to draw up plans to attack if necessary without the use of gas. Gough proposed (17 September 1915) that the attack of 2nd Division be abandoned but wrote that "a moderately good chance of success if there is an element of surprise ... this attack, by its suddenness and the size of the force employed, is aimed at capturing the enemy's second line, viz. Hulluch-Staelie-Haisnes, in practically one rush." He also offered a more cautious Plan B, for an attack over the course of two to seven days, with diversionary artillery attacks followed by sequential attacks by 9th and 7th divisions. Haig used these, and Rawlinson's similar proposals, to lobby GHQ for the attack he wanted.

Initial attacks
On 25 September the order came down to release the gas, despite the wind being unfavourable (i.e. likely to blow it back over British troops). Although Edmonds and Liddell Hart blamed Captain Ernest Gold (meteorological officer) and Maj-Gen Horne (GOC 2nd Division), Foulkes (the gas officer) later hinted that "still higher authority" may have been responsible, and a gas officer Lt Sewill recorded being told that the order came from Corps – i.e. Gough. At 5:20 am Gough had advised Haig that it was too late to cancel the gas release. However, Nick Lloyd blames Haig for drawing up such an inflexible plan, dependent on gas, in the first place. Gough had already angered officers of 9th Division by micro-managing brigade orders.

On Gough's left 2nd Division met with heavy losses, the CO of 1st Middlesex recording that the attacking waves "were all shot down within ten minutes". On Gough's right 7th Division captured the enemy first line, albeit with heavy loss.

In Gough's centre 26th Brigade, part of 9th Division, captured Hohenzollern Redoubt, but 28 Brigade were repulsed on the left. Gough was away from his headquarters for two hours that morning as he tried to discover why 28 Brigade were not making progress. Shortly after 9:10 am, just after 28 Brigade reports had reached division HQ, orders came from Corps to renew the assault at midday. The GOC, Major-General G. H. Thesiger, made clear that the orders came from Gough and "dissociated" himself from them. The bombardment was from 11:30 am to 12 noon as planned, but orders only reached the two forward battalions just before noon, forcing the men to attack at 12:15 pm after very little preparation, suffering predictable loss from a prepared enemy. Gough made little mention of this episode in his memoirs, while the divisional history (1921) was scathing about "forlorn hope" "an offence against a well-understood military principle" "futile" "an almost unbelievable optimism" "the persistence in a frontal attack showed a serious lack of flexibility in the Higher Command in making use of the division". Nick Lloyd argues that Gough was far too influenced by the initial favourable reports, and that his behaviour displayed the aggression and impatience for which he was later to become notorious. Thesiger was relatively new to his post, unlike Horne (2nd Division) who was an experienced commander on ground where little progress had been expected anyway.

Gough had at first ordered his divisions to commit their reserve brigades, but later in the day, when it became clear that the attack had been less successful than hoped, withdrew all three reserve brigades to form a corps reserve. On 26 September Gough was ordered to renew his attack towards Citie St Elie, but during the night a German counterattack had retaken the Quarries off tired British troops, and instead they had to stabilise their position along the former German front line (Gough later recorded "fresh anxieties").

On 26 September Gough sacked Brigadier-General W. A. Oswald, GOC of 73 Brigade, part of 24th Division, as it was moving up to the front. There is little evidence to support a later claim that he had "broken down mentally"; rather, Gough was concerned that the brigade might not hold its position around Fosse 8 against German counterattacks. Although Gough later acquired a reputation as a ruthless sacker of officers, he seldom did so while they were in action, and his dislike of Indian Army officers and elderly "dugouts" (retired officers recalled to service – Oswald was both) may have played a role. A hasty attack by 64 Brigade (part of 21st Division) at 1:45 pm that day, after an excited message from a junior staff officer, is also witness to the fear of sacking under which brigadiers worked.

I Corps refusal to feed through reserve units on 26 September caused these attacks to die out.

Subsequent attacks
Haig, just informed of Thesiger's death, visited Gough at 2:15 pm on 27 September. Gough recorded that Haig was "visibly worried", "sharp" and "cross", and Gough later admitted that he may have passed some of this behaviour down to his subordinates.

Although Fosse 8 had been lost to a German counterattack on 27 September, 73 Brigade had been able to establish a position on the east face of Hohenzollern Redoubt. Another week of fighting ensued as First Army fed in reinforcements to stop further German progress and retake ground. Maj-Gen Edward Bulfin (GOC 28th Division) was deployed here between 27 September and 5 October, and attempted to retake Fosse 8. Bulfin told the Official Historian (in 1927) "I have a very confused memory of Loos – a sort of horrid nightmare. I was under Hugh (sic) Gough – and I never want to serve under him again. I remember he ordered me to attack a Fosse – and of course the whole thing was hopeless." His colleague Brig-Gen Pereira (85 Brigade), who met him in England later in October, recalled that Gough thought Bulfin slow and constantly ordered attacks without proper artillery support. In The Fifth Army Gough recorded that Bulfin was more concerned with lecturing him about how to command a corps (e.g. that "infantry were not cavalry") than with "deal(ing) with the serious problem before his division".

On 6 October I Corps issued a stinging rebuke to 28th Division. The twelve points included "misleading and inaccurate reports" "want of discipline and soldierly bearing" in one battalion, and the "disgraceful" retreat of another, "great slackness" "too much laisser (sic) faire" although the report also complained that it was not the business of Corps to command the division. In fact 28th Division, who were much criticised by Haig and Gough, had fought hard in wet weather, against strong German resistance, winning two VCs in the process.

Ousting of Sir John French
Gough began a corps-level inquiry into the lessons of the battle (10 October), which after a discussion with Haig was followed by an Army-level inquiry (20 October). Gough's inquiries after the battle ascertained that British attacks had been stymied by lack of grenades, but had come close to achieving a breakthrough in areas where the wind had carried British chlorine gas over the German lines.

Gough was one of several senior officers invited to correspond with the King to keep him informed of military developments. After the Battle of Loos, with intrigues afoot to remove French from command of the BEF, Gough was one of the senior officers who spoke to Lord Haldane (9 October 1915) and the King (24 October 1915) against French. He told the King "I would not pretend that Sir John was fitted for the responsibilities he had, and the king was surprised by the examples I gave him of the C-in-C's failings" Haig agreed with Gough (14 November) that on his visit to London he should tell Milner about the "faulty working of the military machine in France". French was shortly forced to "resign" as Commander-in-Chief.

Military ideas
Gough later commented on the draft of the Official History (1926) that a limited attack at Loos would have been more sensible, as it could always have been reinforced if Joffre's offensive succeeded, and was critical of Haig for – as so often – attempting to achieve decisive victory with insufficient means.

Notes from a conference held by Gough on 20 December 1915 indicate that at the time he still thought in terms of the principles of warfare as taught at Staff College: he still expected an "advance guard" to move forward until, after two or three days, a plan had been decided on for deploying the bulk of British forces, whereas in reality, by 1917, the opening day would often prove the most effective of any offensive. Like many British generals of the time, he still blamed the failures of that year on human error in applying the principles of warfare, rather than on the need to concentrate artillery, learn new tactics, and allow senior officers to gain experience.

The Somme

Initial phases

Training cavalry
Haig originally wanted to launch an offensive in Flanders, and told Gough to be prepared to take I Corps up there for this offensive – Gough sent Paul Maze, a member of his staff, to prepare sketches of the ground. Haig did not completely abandon his hopes for a Flanders Offensive, and as late as 30 June 1916 Aylmer Haldane noted in his diary that several corps commanders senior to Gough (Hew Fanshawe of V Corps, Fergusson of II Corps) were being removed, and speculated that this was to clear the way for Gough to command Second Army in Flanders.

Gough was appointed GOC Reserve Corps on 4 April 1916, which was to push through and exploit any breakthrough achieved at the Somme. Gough spent most of the next two months supervising the training of the cavalry divisions, including staff rides and tactical exercises. He was asked for his opinion on the battlefield conditions which would be necessary for massed cavalry to move through, and on the organisation needed to control such a force both behind the lines and after the breakthrough. His staff, initially run by Edward "Moses" Beddington, were initially an adjunct of Haig's GHQ. Beddington had to liaise with XIII and XV Corps (on Rawlinson's right) to draw up contingency plans in case "things went as we hoped for" and with Jacob, who was to be given command of II Corps, although it was not yet clear what divisions this would contain.

An officer recorded that "Goughie ... was in his element when ordering cavalry brigades around" while a major thought him "drunk with power" for sacking so many officers who were not up to scratch "yet the Chief [i.e. Haig] can see no wrong in him". By mid-June he was also supervising the training of the 1st Indian Cavalry Division and 2nd Indian Cavalry Division.

Plans for exploitation
In May, after discussions with Rawlinson, Gough proposed that two brigades of cavalry should be used, one in the north and one in the south, to assist the infantry in the event of a German collapse. He also suggested (letter to the BEF Chief of Staff, Kiggell, 1 May 1916) that a further entire cavalry division should be used in the north to help roll up the enemy second line, but this was vetoed by Haig, who wrote in the margin of the document that the [high] ground was unsuitable for "masses of cavalry", and who ordered Gough to restrict himself to a brigade each in the Ancre Valley and at Montauban (near the north and south of the British positions respectively).

Reserve Corps was renamed Reserve Army on 22 May 1916, (a development described as "ominous" by Prior & Wilson) although technically still part of Rawlinson's Fourth Army. In late June the plans were recast, despite the requirements of the Battle of Verdun causing a reduction in the planned French contribution to the offensive from 39 divisions to twelve. Instead of exploiting southeast to cover the flank of a French crossing of the Somme, Haig (memo to Rawlinson 16 June, Haig diary 21 June) now wrote that once Pozières Ridge was taken, "an effort should be made to push the cavalry through" and anticipated that Gough was to exploit northeast to Bapaume and then, once further reinforcements had moved up, turn north to Monchy to take the German Arras positions in "flank and reverse". Jacob's II Corps was either to be under Gough or else to reinforce Allenby's Third Army (opposite Arras) directly.

Haig told Gough (diary 27 June) he was "too inclined to aim at fighting a battle at Bapaume" but should instead be ready to push on, before the Germans had a chance to attack him from the North. He also rebuked Rawlinson for wanting his men to consolidate for an hour or so on the German last line rather than pushing on, and for not having decided which units Gough was to take command of. Haig would have preferred Gough to take command of the two left hand corps (VIII Corps and X Corps) at once (i.e. prior to the infantry attack) but instead, that evening, approved Rawlinson's plan for Gough to set up HQ at Albert as soon as the Pozières Heights had fallen and to push through with the Reserve Army.

By now Reserve Army had three infantry and three cavalry divisions. Research by Stephen Badsey among the surviving evidence suggests that the final plan was probably for Gough to commit 25th Division, followed by two of the three cavalry divisions, then the II Corps (three divisions) to exploit any breakthrough achieved in the initial attack.

Philip Howell wrote (30 July 1916) that Gough "became more and more optimistic as the day of the battle drew near". Wynne later wrote to the Official Historian Edmonds (in 1930) that even after the disaster on the northern part of the British front, on the First Day of the Somme Gough was "ultro (sic) optimistic" and promoted "far reaching" plans.

Battle of Albert

On 1 July Gough visited Rawlinson twice in the morning. In the afternoon Haig, not yet aware of how badly the attack had gone in the northern sector and believing that Rawlinson was about to be able to push his reserves through, visited Gough and ordered him to "move up" in the evening. Gough visited Rawlinson for the third time in the afternoon but was told that there would be no breakthrough that day, so he ordered cavalry to return to billets. At 7 pm Rawlinson telephoned to give command of X and VIII Corps (the northern sector of the Somme front, where the worst losses and smallest gains had occurred on 1 July), with orders to "push them on again". Taking command on 2 July, Gough reported that VIII Corps communication trenches were blocked with dead and wounded troops and X Corps was found to be little better. In the early hours of 3 July, Rawlinson ordered Gough to renew the attack on his sector, orders which Haig then countermanded.

Gough was ordered to attack towards Schwaben Redoubt (where British survivors of the assault on 1 July were believed to be holding out). However, despite the wishes of Haig and Rawlinson that he (in the words of the BEF chief of Staff Kiggell) "damp down his operations to the lowest level", Gough obtained permission to attack an enemy salient south-east of Thiepval, with elements of the 32nd Division and 49th Division. He ordered an attack by 14th and 75th brigades (under 32nd Division, part of X Corps). In the event he attacked with six battalions (fewer than two brigades), even though he thought the attack only a gamble with "prospects good enough to justify the attempt". The attacking units were not given time to prepare, orders were delayed in transmission, 32nd Division was ordered to attack over a frontage of  rather than the  planned, and the attack was delayed from 0315 to 0600, to coincide with a Fourth Army attack at Ovillers. The artillery, owing to communications difficulties, had already fired off half its stock of ammunition (although the Official History, contradicting itself, also states that Gough had agreed that this would be done deliberately). Sheffield describes the attack as "a complete shambles", although he comments that Gough was not entirely to blame and that it typified the "chaos" of British operations at that stage. Gough observed the attack and later claimed to have regretted having launched it. In the afternoon of 3 July, Reserve Army was formally made independent of Fourth Army.

Over the following months most of the shells and heavy artillery would be supporting Rawlinson's efforts, and although Gough was given extra guns later, he never had as many as Fourth Army. Whereas Reserve Army was allocated 14,000 18-pounder and 880 6-inch howitzer rounds daily in July, Fourth Army had 56,000 and 4,920 respectively. Haig's orders to Gough were to "sap", i.e. try to make small penetrations into the German lines to open them up to flanking attacks. Kiggell wrote Gough a memo (4 July) making plain that Reserve Army's role was to assist Rawlinson's attacks, by pinning down German reserves and that he was to keep within the quantity of shells which he was given. In July Gough believed that frequent attacks "in modest numbers" would keep casualties low, by keeping the Germans "off balance" and so ruling out the need or another "massive assault" on the lines of 1 July – this was a mistaken view, as small narrow-front attacks allowed the Germans to concentrate their fire, so contributing to the massive British losses of that month.

Gough was promoted temporary general on 7 July 1916.

Reserve Army took Ovillers on 16 July. In July Jacob's II Corps replaced X Corps in the line as Gough thought Morland (X Corps) slow and overly cautious.

Summer

Pozières

The events of 1 July had shown that the German positions on VIII Corps sector and much of X Corps sector as well, were too strong to attack frontally. Gough's efforts until early September consisted of attacks by two divisions of X Corps, later assisted by the newly arrived II Corps, assisting Rawlinson's left flank. On only two occasions before 3 September, were efforts coordinated with that of the Fourth Army and one of those (22/23 July) by accident.

On 15 July, the day after the Fourth Army success at the Battle of Bazentin Ridge, Haig envisaged Gough exploiting up the Ancre valley, to attack the enemy on Third Army's front (to Gough's north) from the south. The Pozières sector was handed over from Rawlinson to Gough on 15 July, making the Albert–Bapaume Road the boundary between the two armies. When Fourth Army's attacks again ran out of steam, Haig ordered Gough (18 July) to prepare for "methodical operations against Pozières ... with as little delay as possible", to capture the summit of Thiepval Ridge and cover the left flank of Fourth Army's advance. Haig sent some fresh divisions to X Corps and also deployed 1 ANZAC Corps, newly arrived on the Western Front, opposite Pozières. This was the most important attack yet expected of Gough.

Gough had to be dissuaded from launching 1st Australian Division against Pozières at 24 hours notice. Charles Bean, the Australian Official Historian, later wrote that on 18 July Maj-Gen "Hooky" Walker, the British officer commanding 1st Australian Division, had been ordered to attack Pozières the following night. Walker was appalled by these "scrappy & unsatisfactory orders from Reserve Army", later recording in his diary his concerns that he would be "rushed into an ill-prepared ... operation". I ANZAC Corps HQ had not yet arrived on the Somme and Walker, with "the sweat on (his) brow", argued with Gough, as did his chief of staff Brudenell White, until Gough gave in. Walker later wrote (in 1928) that the incident was "the very worst exhibition of Army commandship that occurred during the whole campaign, though God knows the 5th Army [as Reserve Army was later designated] was a tragedy throughout". Walker later wrote of how he had had to demand extra artillery, and only obtained permission to attack from the south east rather than the south west (the direction of previous unsuccessful attacks) as Gough wanted after taking Edward "Moses" Beddington, a staff officer whom Gough trusted, with him to reconnoitre the position. Haig advised Gough (20 July) to "go into all the difficulties carefully", as that division had not fought in France before. Gough defended the ANZACs to Haig against "tittle-tattle" at GHQ by officers who had "no idea of the real worth of the Australians". Gough later claimed (letter to Edmonds in 1939) he had given Walker no choice but had himself ordered the change in the direction of the attack.

The attack was delayed until 12:30 am on the night of 22/23 July and Pozières was taken, partly as a result of planning and partly as tired German troops were in the process of being relieved by fresh troops. The fall of Pozières on 22/23 July was the most successful part of a Big Push involving eight divisions, spread across five corps, from Pozières on the left to Guillemont on Rawlinson's right (Rawlinson had decided to push ahead without the French after they had requested a postponement of their part of the offensive). After German counterattacks had failed, the Germans then subjected the village to several weeks of severe shelling.

Clashes with subordinates
Gough used his corps as "postboxes", whereas Rawlinson was more tolerant of debate and discussion. Gough was reluctant to allow corps their normal role of control of artillery (he centralised artillery at Army level under Brigadier-General Tancred) and in planning operations. A memo of 16 July ordered that all points for bombardment by heavy howitzers must be selected at corps-level, and then, four days later, he ordered that after any bombardment, at whatever level it had been requested, daily reports were to be submitted to Army HQ. Neill Malcolm (Chief of Staff Reserve Army) recorded several instances in his diary (6 July, 13 July, 18 July) of corps commanders chafing at his "interference". Before coming under Gough's command, Hunter-Weston (GOC VIII Corps) wrote to his wife (1 July) of his personal liking for Gough – by 3 August he wrote to her that his staff were glad to be moving to the Second Army at Ypres, that Reserve Army staff had not run smoothly and that although he liked Gough and thought him "a good soldier ... he is hardly a big minded enough man to make a really good Army Commander". He also complained of Gough's "impetuosity" and "optimism".

Gough also clashed badly with Philip Howell, Chief of Staff of II Corps. Howell thought Gough "very loveable in many ways", if perhaps not quite sane, and "really quite a child & can be managed like one if treated as such & humoured". By 24 July 1916 Howell was writing that Gough and Malcolm had "managed to put everybody's back up" and throughout August 1916 complained repeatedly about Army-level micromanagement, with Reserve Army allegedly even taking direct control of four of 12th Division machine guns during an attack on 2 August. Philip Howell claimed (29 August 1916) that Jacob (II Corps), Percival (49th Division) and even Neill Malcolm (!) were terrified of Gough. Gough thought Howell a "great thorn" who spent much time "trying to argue", avoiding fighting and disobeying orders. Howell was killed by shellfire in September.

Gough also clashed with Cavan (XIV Corps) (3 August). Gough's attempts to micro-manage had little effect on the strong-minded Cavan.

Mouquet Farm

Gough ordered further attacks to seize the German OG1 and OG2 trenches north of Pozières, and to take Mouquet Farm (which lies approximately between Pozières and Thiepval). The first attack, by tired troops in the dark, failed. 1st Australian Division were withdrawn on 25 July and replaced by 2nd Australian Division. Sheffield & Todman argue that Gough's "direct operational control" of 2nd Australian Division on 29 July contributed to the failure of that attack, as Gough pressured Maj-Gen Legge to attack before preparations were complete. The German positions were on a reverse slope, so wire and machine gun positions could not be destroyed by bombardment. Bean blamed Legge for not standing up to Gough, and wrote that Brudenell White blamed himself for not doing so, although Sheffield argues that this is not entirely fair, as Legge, a "colonial", should have had more support from Corps level.

By the end of July it was clear that the Germans were not about to crumble as Haig had hoped, and on 2 August he ordered Reserve Army to conduct methodical attacks in the area from Pozières to Mouquet Farm and Ovillers, as economically with men and munitions as possible, so as to draw in German reserves and thus assist with Rawlinson's attacks on Gough's right flank. Haig recorded (diary 3 August) that Gough had demanded "reasons in writing" from Legge, after the failure of the Australian attack. Gough had written to Birdwood (1 ANZAC Corps Commander) demanding an explanation and asking if the attack would have succeeded given "greater energy and foresight on the part of the higher commanders". Birdwood refused to pass this note on to Legge as he thought it was "essential to give (him) a fair trial". Legge's second attack on Mouquet Farm, was better planned and succeeded on 4 August.

Gough now planned to capture Thiepval by converging attacks by the ANZACs from the east and by II Corps to the south west. This meant that the ANZACs had to attack along the crest of Thiepval Ridge, facing German fire from west, north and east. These attacks were often small in scale and were often not coordinated with II Corps attacks, let alone with Fourth Army, allowing the Germans – who knew the BEF plan from captured documents – a chance to concentrate their fire on the attackers.

Gough almost pushed Maj-Gen Robert Fanshawe (48th Division) (25 August) to the point of resignation. Gough complained to Haig (Haig diary 29 August) that "the Commanders of the Australians are becoming less offensive in spirit! The men are all right...." In over a month of fighting II Corps and I ANZAC Corps advanced  towards Mouquet Farm and Thiepval. The BEF (not just ANZACs but also the 12th, 25th, 48th divisions and the Canadian Corps) suffered approximately 20,000 casualties in these attacks from 7 August to 12 September. The ANZACs had suffered 23,000 casualties in six weeks, a similar loss to what they had endured in eight months at Gallipoli.

Prior & Wilson criticised Gough for his responsibility for what they called "the Mouquet Farm fiasco", not least because at some point in September (documentary evidence of the exact date has not been found) Gough had changed his mind and decided to attack Thiepval solely from the front, rather than trying to outflank it via Mouquet Farm. Philpott believes that although Haig's instructions were "confusing and contradictory", Gough (and Rawlinson) share some responsibility for the costly nature of these small piecemeal attacks, whose supposed aim was to "wear down" the Germans, prior to the decisive breakthrough which Haig was hoping to achieve in September. In August, clearly still hopeful that decisive victory could be attained on the Somme, Gough wrote to one of his nephews: "We are breaking in bit by bit and we must not stop until we have made the gap. It would be terrible to ask our men to begin their attacks all over again on fresh defences next year."

Autumn

Initial attack on Thiepval
A conference was held on 23 August to plan the attack on Thiepval, and the V Corps Chief of Staff (Brig-Gen Boyd) later brushed aside the GOC 6th Division's objections that an afternoon attack was unwise. The next day detailed plans for each division's attack were issued not at corps level but by Reserve Army.

3 September saw an attack by four divisions of Reserve Army from Pozières to the Ancre valley, simultaneously with an attack by Fourth Army. V Corps, extending Reserve Army operations into the Ancre valley for the first time, attacked towards St Pierre Divion and Schwaben Redoubt (north of Thiepval) to attack Thiepval from the north. II Corps (48th and 25th Divisions, moved up in mid-August) attacked Thiepval. These attacks failed. 4th Australian Division gained part of Fabeck Graben Redoubt north of Mouquet Farm, which was then lost by the Canadian Corps when it relieved 1 ANZAC Corps in the line.

The attack by 39th and 49th divisions (part of II Corps) failed, with some battalions taking between 30% and 50% casualties. Gough attributed the failure to lack of "martial qualities", lack of "discipline and motivation", "ignorance on the part of the Commanding officers" and "poor spirit in the men", to which Claud Jacob, GOC II Corps, added "want of direction", "stage fright", and cowardice on the part of the brigadier, while also commenting adversely on the lack of casualties among the C.O.'s. V Corps, at Reserve Army's insistence, sent a detailed critique of the operation to 39th Division. However, Gough took responsibility for not having cancelled the operation when it was clear surprise had been lost. He had lost an ADC wounded next to him as he observed attacks, his third during the war.

Assisting Rawlinson's offensive
Gough had submitted (28 August) an ambitious plan for the capture of Courcelette on his right flank. This was rejected by Kiggell, who told him that he was to continue to conduct limited operations to assist Rawlinson with the Battle of Flers–Courcelette the next Fourth Army attack, which, if successful, would enable Rawlinson to attack Thiepval (on Gough's front) from the rear. In the event Haig changed his mind at the last moment.

Two days before Flers–Courcelette, Haig (13 September) – over Rawlinson's objections (Rawlinson diary 14 September) – ordered an attack on Martinpuich (Rawlinson's left flank) and an attack by 2nd and 3rd Canadian divisions on Courcelette (Gough's right flank) with a view to opening a gap which could be exploited by cavalry. Haig also urged Gough and Rawlinson (separately) not to neglect any opportunity to put the cavalry through, the ultimate aim being to take the Germans facing the Third and even First armies (to Gough's north) from the rear. II and V Corps were also to make feint attacks at Thiepval. The Canadian assault on Courcelette was a great success. Gough wrote (to his brother Johnnie's widow Dorothea, 23 September 1916) that many corps and division commanders were "incompetent" and that "considerable exercise of firmness" was needed to get them to obey orders.

Thiepval Ridge

After Flers-Courcelette (15 Sep) Haig, perhaps believing a decisive breakthrough to be imminent, initially envisaged Gough attacking Thiepval, together with further attacks by Fourth Army and by the French further south – an attack by ten divisions.

Gough's plan was for 18th Division to capture Thiepval and Schwaben Redoubt, 11th Division to capture Mouquet Farm and Zollern and Stuff Redoubts (roughly north of Mouquet Farm) while on the right 1st and 2nd Canadian divisions were to attack from Courcelette to Regina Trench which lay just beyond the ridge line. Gough allocated all seven of his tanks (five of which broke down before reaching the lines) to the Canadians.

The preliminary bombardment began on 23 September. This was the heaviest barrage yet fired by Reserve Army, assisted by an indirect machine gun barrage into the German rear areas. Gough had 570 field guns and 270 howitzers to attack along a  front (roughly twice the concentration of 1 July, but only half that of the Battle of Bazentin Ridge on 14 July and much the same as that of the Battle of Flers–Courcelette on15 September.

Allenby's Third Army was to co-operate with an attack on Gough's left flank (Haig diary 24 September 30 September).

In the event poor weather delayed the attacks until the early afternoon of 25 September. As Gough planned to use a few tanks to assist his attack, Haig ordered him to delay until the following morning when they could be concealed in the morning mist but in the event further delays, for which the reason is unclear, meant that Gough attacked at 12:35 pm on 26 September, exactly a day after Rawlinson and Foch.

Four divisions of Canadian and II Corps attacked between Courcelette and Schwaben. The Battle of Thiepval Ridge was Gough's most ambitious operation to date. The attack of 26 September showed the improvement in British tactics. Mouquet Farm at last fell in the afternoon. On the western sector, lodgements were gained in Zollern, Stuff and Schwaben redoubts and British forces pushed to the edge of St Pierre Divion. Thiepval was surrounded and captured by Maxse's highly trained 18th Division by 08.30 on 27 September. Regina Trench and parts of Stuff and Schwaben Redoubts remained in German hands. This fighting demonstrated that, either attacking German positions with proper artillery support, or in hand-to-hand fighting in which artillery support mattered little, British volunteer infantry could fight as well as the Germans. The same would prove true in November. Gough's capture of Thiepval (an original objective for 1 July) preserved his status with Commander-in-Chief.

Tactical ideas
A 5 October 1916 memo (over Neill Malcolm's signature) for the guidance of division and brigade commanders (bypassing corps), sheds light on Gough's tactical thinking. Although he understood the importance of the creeping barrage and of mopping-up parties, he was – unlike Rawlinson – uninterested in bite and hold tactics and tended to feel that opportunities would be lost if infantry were obliged to stop at a predetermined point to stick to an artillery plan.

He recommended aiming for deep advances into enemy positions, with troops attacking up to five consecutive preassigned objectives, with waves aiming for predetermined objectives in a conveyor-belt approach. Each brigade was to attack in up to eight "waves": two battalions, making up the first four waves, were to take the first objective and another two battalions, perhaps deployed in columns for speed of movement, would then take the second, with no battalions held in brigade-level reserve (the argument being that orders would never reach them in time). He recommended that each division attack with two brigades and hold a third brigade in reserve, ready to take the third objective, by which time the first two brigades would have been reorganised to take the fourth objective. The fifth objective would require fresh troops.

He wanted commanders to keep as far forward as possible, even if it was not possible to keep in contact with their superiors by telephone, in order not to have to waste time sending junior officers forward to reconnoitre and report back. The brigade commander was to stay forward so that while the second objective was being assaulted they could reorganise the troops who had just taken the first objective, so that they could take the third. Divisional commanders were also urged to stay forward so that they could reorganise the attacking brigades so as to create their own reserve. Simpson comments that corps would have the benefit of RFC patrols to keep in touch, but their own reserves would be too far back to be of use, while heavy artillery controlled at corps level would be more important for counterbattery work and for the preliminary bombardment, rather than being needed during the infantry assault. Simpson also comments that all this was very similar to VIII Corps views prior to 1 July attacks, and that Reserve Army's attacks in October were to be little more successful, although weather and mud made Gough's task more difficult. Although it is true that opportunities for advance sometimes went begging for lack of initiative (e.g. at Bazentin Ridge on 14 July 1916), Sheffield argues that Gough was overly focussed on infantry rather than artillery tactics, and was demanding too much from his men.

Gough agreed with Haig's suggestion (Haig diary 8 October) that "the deterioration of the Enemy's fighting qualities" meant that it was not necessary for British troops to be protected by a barrage once they had captured an enemy position, as this would hamper reserves from pushing on to the next objective. General Bridges later wrote (in "Alarms and Excursions") that "With the true cavalry spirit, (Gough) was always for pushing on". Rawlinson (diary 9 October) recorded his concerns at Gough's "hourush tactics and no reserves, as they are not sound".

The fighting at Thiepval went on until November and was later criticised by the Official Historian for lack of co-ordination and excessive reliance on infantry elan.

Battle of the Ancre Heights

The Battle of the Ancre Heights (1 October – 11 November) was conducted further to the left of Gough's sector. Haig issued orders (29 September) for further advances by Reserve and Fourth Armies. Gough was to attack Loupart Wood from the south and Beaumont Hamel from the west. The plan was for Reserve Army to advance  and capture more ground in one battle than in three months of campaigning.

On 8 October, the 1st and 3rd Canadian divisions, on Gough's right flank, assisted another of Rawlinson's offensives by attacking unsuccessfully towards Le Sars and Regina Trench, only to be held up by German wire. Speaking to Haig that afternoon, Gough blamed the 3rd Canadian Division, claiming that in some cases they had not even left their trenches. Stuff Redoubt fell (9 October) to a battalion of 25th Division. Schwaben Redoubt was attacked unsuccessfully (9 October) in a surprise night attack with no barrage, then successfully on 14 October after a two-day bombardment. These costly penny-packet attacks sometimes involved little more than a single battalion. A big German counterattack was then repulsed. By this time Gough was discussing with Haig the possibility that the war might go on into 1917, requiring fresh offensives.

After two weeks of rain had rendered plans for exploitation unrealistic, Gough issued a new, more cautious plan (15 October), in which 45 tanks were to be used, although he was still under pressure from Haig to exploit to the north and north-east. Stuff and Regina Trenches (which ran approximately west–east north of a line from Thiepval to Courcelette) were then captured in a major attack by 35th, 25th, 18th and 4th Canadian divisions, completing the capture of the Ancre Heights. The battle testified to the revived German defence after their panic of September.

Wilson, whom Gough had disliked since the Curragh incident, commanded IV Corps first alongside then under Gough in 1916. Wilson commented in his diary (21 October) on reports of Gough micro-managing divisions and even brigades. That autumn Lord Loch told Wilson "Goughie is the best hated & most useless & most dangerous General we have got".

After the success of 21 October, Gough once again presented more ambitious plans, with Haig offering (24 October) to place an extra two cavalry divisions (for three in total) at his disposal – this at a time when even quite minor infantry attacks on Fourth Army sector were having to be cancelled because of mud. Haig cautioned Gough to wait for three days of fine weather (26 October) before attacking again. Gough complained that Brigadier-General Radcliffe (chief of staff, Canadian Corps) "made unnecessary difficulties" (Haig Diary 30 October 1916).

Reserve Army was redesignated Fifth Army on 30 October 1916.

The Ancre

Political considerations
Gough fought the last major British attack on the Somme at the Ancre, beginning on 13 November. This was "perhaps Gough's finest hour as an offensive general", although a large part of its success was owed to delays because of the weather, which gave more time for planning and preparation and which forced the original plans (drawn up by GHQ in October) to be scaled back. Haig urged Gough (2 and 6 November) to wait for dry weather before proceeding. After continuous rain between 24 October and 3 November, Fifth Army was ordered (5 November) to conduct only a "limited" attack and authorised to wait until the weather was good enough.

Haig sent Kiggell (Chief of Staff BEF) to Gough's HQ (8 November) to explain the motivation for the attack, although Kiggell stressed that Haig did not want the attack to proceed unless there were good prospects of success. The aim was to pin down German troops which might otherwise have been sent to Romania, to impress on the Russians that the BEF was still fighting, as well as strengthening Haig's hand in the inter-Allied conference due to start at Chantilly on 15 November, at which the possible transfer of Western Allied troops to Salonika was to be discussed. Gough later recorded that the first murmurings against Haig's leadership were beginning to be heard in London. Simkins suggests that Haig wanted to be able to blame Gough if the Ancre attack went wrong but take the credit if it succeeded.

Gough then consulted his corps commanders (10 November): Jacob (II Corps) was persuaded to try for deeper objectives as Fanshawe (V Corps) and Congreve (XIII Corps) wanted. The attack was agreed for 13 November. Staff officers and patrols inspected the ground and Gough (10–11 November) visited six divisional commanders and ten brigadiers, also seeing two battalion commanders at each brigade headquarters. He had asked his corps commanders to make similar inquiries. He found no consensus as to whether or not the ground was dry enough. The start time was set for 5:45 am after further consultations with Jacob, Fanshawe and divisional commanders.

Kiggell again visited Gough on 12 November – Gough later wrote (in The Fifth Army) of how any further delay would have had a bad effect on troop morale, and how after four dry days the prospects were as good as they were likely to be that winter, and of how he had sat looking out of the window turning over the decision in his mind after Kiggell had "gravely elaborated the great issues at stake" – that afternoon Haig also visited him and gave him the go-ahead (writing in his diary "a success at this time was much wanted" and "I am ready to run reasonable risks ... (but given) the difficulties of ground and weather. Nothing is as costly as failure!")

Sheffield comments that this sequence of events indicates that Haig enjoyed warmer relations with Gough than with, say, Rawlinson, but also suggests that he felt the need to supervise him closely. He also comments that although Gough consulted his subordinates, it is unclear that he took their advice: Simon Robbins quotes evidence of warnings from some corps, division and brigade staffs that troops were exhausted and conditions too poor to attack. Neill Malcolm's Memorandum on Operations (13 November 1916) recorded the political reasons for the attack.

Initial success
The Ancre attack employed 282 heavy guns and a creeping barrage, over an area which had not been heavily fought over so far, thus allowing men and guns to be moved more easily over relatively undisturbed ground. The volume of shells exceeded that put on the entire enemy line on 1 July. After a seven-day preliminary bombardment, 13 November saw an attack by 5 divisions, with 2 brigades on the flanks, the largest British attack since September. Lessons were also learned from previous battles: a mine was blown at Beaumont Hamel, simultaneously with the commencement of the artillery barrage, far more successfully than the mine which had been blown in the same area 10 minutes prior to the infantry assault on 1 July.

The attack began at 5:45 am, behind an effective creeping barrage, with the German machine guns on the crest behind Beaumont Hamel completely suppressed by 40 guns specifically given this task. The attack succeeded in the southern sector, where the 63rd Royal Naval Division took Beaucourt by 10:45 am, albeit with some attacking battalions taking 40–50% casualties, and the 51st Highland Division took Beaumont Hamel and St Pierre Divion, where the French practice was adopted of assigning a 4.5 inch howitzer to shell the entrance of each German dugout until the "mopping-up" platoons had reached them. However, further north in V Corps sector the attack on Serre was less successful because of mud and uncut wire, despite Gough visiting the sector at 2 pm to order further attacks. Those who fought at Beaumont Hamel thought it had been well-planned. Haig wrote in his diary (13 November) "the success has come at a most opportune moment".

Gough ordered further attacks the next day (14 November), leading to the vicious local struggles for Munich and Frankfort Trenches. When he learned of this, Haig telephoned from Paris that he did not want any further attacks "on a large scale" until his return from the conference, but this news did not reach Gough until 9 am on 15 November, when the attack was about to begin, and after consulting his corps commanders Gough decided to proceed, a decision which Haig approved retrospectively that afternoon.
Sheffield writes that these attacks "bore a distinct resemblance to the narrow-fronted, penny-packet attacks around Pozières and elsewhere in the summer, with the added complication of appalling weather."

Brigadier-General Home of the Cavalry Corps noted (15 November) that the rumours that Gough was to be promoted to Commander-in-Chief in Haig's place were "too comic as I don't think they could ever make him do what they wanted".

Final stages
After the first attempt to take Munich and Frankfort trenches (15 November) failed, the commanders of 2nd and 51st Divisions were asked for detailed reports. Maj-Gen George Harper (GOC 51st Division) blamed the slowness of the creeping barrage, which caused his "impetuous" men to suffer casualties from friendly fire, and the fact that the attack had not been "under one command". Maj-Gen W.G. Walker (GOC 2nd Division) commented that the attack had been too hurried, as his troops had not been familiar with the ground, and that Fanshawe (GOC V Corps) had rejected his requests for a delay and for a daylight attack. Gough forced 2nd Division to attack for two consecutive days despite protests from its commander (Walker) and chief of staff that the ground was impassable.

Malcolm issued a confidential memo to Corps Commanders (16 November) complaining about their tendency to query and argue about orders. Another Memorandum on Future Operations (16 November) discusses Fanshawe's wish to attack because of "a serious break on his front". Fanshawe held a conference of division commanders (16 November) to discuss the troop and barrage requirements for a renewed attempt.

George Jeffreys later testified that the GOC of 19th Division had complained of the difficulties of attacking at Grandcourt and Gough and his staff "had simply no conception of conditions in the forward area". Gough later demanded to know why that division had not left 58th Brigade in the line for a further 24 hours, which "show(ed) ... that he had no notion of the physical strain on the troops of even a few hours in the line under such conditions".

The first snow of the winter fell on 18 November. The attacks on 18 November suffered around 10,000 casualties. One officer of II Corps later wrote to Edmonds (in 1936) that it had been a "cruel useless sacrifice of life" with men dead from exhaustion in trying to crawl out of the mud, and that given the weather it was obvious "to the very stupidest brain that no success could possibly result". Haig called off the battle. Kiggell later wrote to Edmonds (in 1938) "the later stages of the fight were hardly justified, but Gough was so keen and confident the C-in-C decided to permit them".

A few days later 32nd Division relieved 2nd Division in the line, and their attack would also fail, partly as a result of inaccurate bombardment as 2nd Division staff had not been able to give them an accurate description of where the front line actually was. Gough exercised almost personal control of 32nd Division in fighting for Frankfort Trench from 18 November onwards. The GOC W.H. Rycroft was apprehensive of Gough because of the failure of 3 July and was said by his GSO1 (chief of staff), the future Maj-Gen Wace, to be "terrified of Gough" and on learning in October 1916 that his division was returning to the Somme had remarked "wryly that it would be his undoing unless we went to Rawly's Army", however "lack(ed) the kick in him to stand up to Gough, when all initiative was taken out of his hands". Wace later testified to Edmonds (in 1936) that during the planning for the Ancre orders came down, via Corps, as being very clearly the Army Commander's decision. Rycroft only received the orders at 9:45 pm the night before and called it "another of Gough's mad ideas", and was simply told what orders he was to issue, even for the location of Advanced Brigade Headquarters. After the attack failed Gough sacked up to seven senior officers of 32nd Division, including Rycroft and two brigadiers, one of whom was Jenkins, GOC 75th Brigade.

Gough rebuked Fanshawe in writing (21 November) for lack of grip, and for failing to issue detailed written artillery orders, during 15 November attack. On his copy of the report, against the comment that copies of Gough's remarks were to be sent to the two divisional commanders, Fanshawe wrote "I hope not all of them" and protested in the margin that he had been in telephone contact with divisions throughout. Simpson criticises Gough for his "poor reasoning and indifference to the views of the men on the spot", although he is also critical of Fanshawe for attempting to blame his own subordinates. Sheffield writes "Some of Gough's points were fair, if harshly expressed, but others were not; some were based on factual inaccuracies. All this suggests a commander who had an incomplete grasp of the realities of the battle." He also remarks on Gough's deliberate humiliation of Fanshawe in front of the latter's subordinates. Walker was relieved of command of 2nd Division on 27 December.

Gough was awarded the KCB in 1916.

Gough and the BEF's "learning curve"
Gough practised top-down command to a degree which was unusual in the British Army of that era, with its culture, evolved in an army designed for fighting small colonial wars, of leaving decisions to "the man on the spot". Andy Simpson argues that although Gough's command methods were clearly more prescriptive than those of Rawlinson's Fourth Army, in which a 20-page summary of division commanders' views was circulated in late August, given Rawlinson's lack of grip this was not necessarily a bad thing. Simpson argues that Gough's hands-on control may have been at Haig's urging, given Haig's dissatisfaction with Rawlinson, and suggests that this may also have been a factor in Gough being employed in major offensives in 1917, whereas Rawlinson was not. Michael Howard cited Gough's love of micro-managing divisions as evidence that he had been overpromoted, and Gary Sheffield concedes that Gough's reputation for touring the trenches to spot dirty rifles suggests that he had found it hard to adapt to his greater responsibilities.

Sheffield argues that Gough's behaviour was to some extent an attempt to answer the dilemma noted by Malcolm (diary 29 June 1916). Malcolm believed that a "happy medium" had been attained between Army maintaining control of operations and delegating decision-making to the "man on the spot" as prescribed by Field Service Regulations. Sheffield describes that claim as "misplaced". The BEF had recently grown from 7 divisions to 70 – the Army had not anticipated or trained for the challenges of officers having to command large formations, nor for trench warfare, nor for the difficulties in communication (which would remain until battlefield radios came into use) involved. Officers' personalities, and how they related with one another, mattered a great deal in how they managed these changes. Part of Gough's concern at micromanaging plans may have been because he knew that once an attack had begun he would have little chance to influence the results.

Sheffield observes that Haig was himself grappling with the dilemma of the degree to which subordinates should be "gripped", and so often gave Gough unclear guidance. Gough himself also had a tendency to ignore orders from above when it suited him, the very tendency he abhorred in his own subordinates.

Some of Gough's ideas were adopted in other armies: Fourth Army's document Artillery Lessons of the Battle of the Somme (18 November) reflected Gough's prescriptive approach rather than the delegation encouraged under Field Service Regulations, or practised by Rawlinson during the Somme. On the other hand, the tactical manual SS144 The Normal Formation for the Attack (February 1917) was a compromise between Gough's view and the opposite view, that each infantry wave should take and consolidate just one objective, with fresh units being fed through to take deeper objectives.

Spring 1917

Execution of deserter
Edmonds later wrote that he had heard Gough say that his men had "no blood lust" and that officers had "no spirit of the offensive", and that he had once come into the mess demanding that an officer (two, in some versions of the story) be shot pour encourager les autres. It has been suggested that this story may relate to the execution of Sub-Lt Edwin Dyett in January 1917, for alleged desertion while serving with the Royal Naval Division at Beaucourt on 13 November 1916. Gough, overruling the Divisional Commander's recommendation for clemency, recommended that the execution proceed.

Advance on the Ancre

On 1 January 1917, Gough was promoted to permanent lieutenant general, while continuing to hold the temporary rank of full general. He was awarded the GCVO in 1917.

Early in 1917 Gough conducted minor operations aimed at "improving our position & hustling the Bosche" (letter to the King's adviser Clive Wigram, 7 January). Birdwood, then commanding I ANZAC Corps, which had briefly been part of Fourth Army, was "very sick" (Rawlinson diary 26 January) at the prospect of having to serve under Gough again. Limited operations were conducted between 10 January and 13 February (at which point there was a cold snap), to seize points of high ground off the enemy. In mid February, having heard reports that the German trenches opposite were thinly held, Gough ordered his divisional commanders to prepare for a general advance. Reconnaissance was hampered by German air superiority. Beginning on the night of 23/4 February the Germans conducted a limited withdrawal on the Ancre Heights which allowed operations to be stepped up by 63rd, 18th and 2nd Divisions, and by 1 ANZAC Corps. Fifth Army occupied Miraumont, Serre and Pys. Brigadier-General Cumming later (in 1922) recalled Gough's visit to the headquarters of 91 Brigade in February 1917. Gough's demands for an immediate advance were impractical owing to the state of the ground and the exhaustion of his troops, and only Gough's departure had allowed his staff to get on with preparing the next day's operations.

When his enemy Wilson was appointed (March 1917) to head Anglo-French liaison at French GQG, Gough wrote to Stamfordham (i.e. for the King to see) complaining of how Wilson had made little impact either as a staff officer in 1914 or in 1916 as a corps commander, but had a great reputation throughout the army for intrigue and for "talk".

With relations between the French Commander-in-Chief Nivelle and the British generals becoming particularly strained, Nivelle asked the British government (7 March 1917) that Haig be sacked and replaced by Gough. Haig openly confronted Gough about the rumours (which Lord Esher had recorded in his diary on 9 March). Gough, to his own ultimate detriment (and unlike Haig) made little effort to cultivate the press. Gough's own view of the Calais Scheme to place the BEF under Nivelle's command was that it would leave Britain a puppet of France as Serbia and Rumania were of Russia, and Austria-Hungary of Germany, and correspondingly likely to be cheated at the peace conference after the war.

Fifth Army stormed the German intermediate line, which had been reached by the end of February, on 10 March.

Advance to the Hindenburg Line, Arras and Bullecourt

Haig had ordered Gough to prepare a major offensive, in "bites" but with "the object of breaking the enemy's front and attracting as many of his reserves as possible" to coincide with Allenby's offensive, originally due to start on or after 15 March.

On 14 March V Corps was repulsed from Bucquoy on the north of Gough's sector; Gough later claimed that he had thought the enemy defences too strong but had permitted the attack at the request of the corps commander.
By now Gough had a reputation among junior officers for "heavy losses and complete failure" "very typical of Gen Gough, who apparently does not care a button about the lives of his men" (Brigadier-General Hodgkin's Diary, 14 March). He had a reputation for "terroris(ing) those under him to the extent that they are afraid to express their opinions for fear of being (sacked)" (Haldane Diary 31 March).

Allenby was annoyed at the apparent favouritism shown to Gough at Army Commanders' conferences. Gough was allowed to expand Fifth Army's role in Arras beyond what had originally been intended. Gough commanded the southern part of the offensive (Horne's First Army attacked in the north, including the famous Canadian attack on Vimy Ridge, while the main attack was conducted by Allenby's Third Army in the centre). 4th Cavalry Division was allotted to Gough's sector to exploit any breakthrough achieved.

Building on his experiences on the Aisne in September 1914, Gough formed mixed brigades of infantry, cavalry, artillery and engineers during the German withdrawal to the Hindenburg Line in mid March. 2–9 April saw costly fighting on the outskirts of the Hindenburg Line. Over the protests of the ANZAC Commanders Gough launched an attack at (First) Bullecourt (10–11 April), described by Sheffield as "hasty, ill-prepared and ultimately disastrous" ... "the infantry plan was disrupted at a late stage by Gough's ill-fated employment of tanks". 4th Australian Brigade lost three-quarters of their men in action, 12th Australian Brigade half of each battalion engaged. Simkins writes that "(Haig) yet again indulged Gough's tendency to launch precipitate and ill-considered attacks", while Prior & Wilson describe the attack as "singularly barren". Bullecourt became known as the "Blood Tub".

Gough was ordered (Haig diary 14 April) to prepare to "pierce" the Hindenburg Line "astride the Bapaume–Cambrai Road" if Allenby's main attack made sufficient progress. Gough attended an Army commanders' conference on 16 April. With the Arras offensive bogging down, he later declined to conduct further infantry attacks as part of the 23 April push, restricting his efforts to artillery only.

At the Army Commanders' Conference on 30 April 1917 Haig, who had just been told that Nivelle was to be sacked, still expected Italian and (contrary to the War Office view) Russian offensives to take place that year. He told the Army commanders that he was not entirely clear what the BEF would be doing for the rest of the year but that he wanted to "shift the centre of gravity up to the Second Army". In the afternoon after the conference he told Gough that he was to command the proposed Flanders Offensive, and ordered him to speak to Colonel Macmullen (who had presented plans, later abandoned, for a tank-led assault at Ypres) and visit the workshop at Erin, where tanks were being prepared for Operation Hush, a proposed amphibious landing on the Belgian Coast.

The Second Battle of Bullecourt (3–15 May) was "memorably bloody and ill-rewarded". Sanders Marble writes: "The results could largely have been predicted before so many lives were lost. Hasty attacks failed with heavy losses. Once adequate time was allowed for preparations the village was finally wrested from the Germans ... it was not the BEF's finest hour" Bullecourt "did not win many plaudits" and further worsened Gough's reputation in the eyes of the Australians.

Third Ypres

Planning the offensive 
While Gough was fighting at Bullecourt, Haig unveiled the timetable for Third Ypres at an Army Commanders' conference at Doullens (17 May). Haig may well have chosen Gough to spearhead Third Ypres because his aggression and preference to attack "at the hurroush" contrasted with the more cautious tactics favoured by Rawlinson and Plumer, and perhaps also because his inexperience and lack of knowledge of the Ypres Salient made him more willing to do Haig's bidding. Haig's admiring biographer John Terraine later wrote that putting Gough in charge of the early stages of Third Ypres was "Haig's greatest and most fatal error". The war correspondent Repington and the CIGS Robertson agreed with one another as early as 5 July 1917 that Plumer should have been chosen because of his knowledge of the Ypres Salient, and Gough himself later came to agree.

Gough later wrote highly of Maxse (XVIII Corps), Jacob (II Corps) and Congreve (XIII Corps), his corps commanders in 1917, although not of Watts (XIX Corps). However, Simon Robbins suggests that the "climate of fear" still pervaded throughout Fifth Army in 1917 and even into 1918. Gough held his first corps commanders' conference on 24 May 1917, before he had moved his HQ to the Ypres sector – the composition of divisions and corps for Third Ypres had already been chosen by this point. Simpson argues that by this time, possibly because staff officers had become more experienced at their jobs, Fifth Army's approach appears to have become "more hands-off and consultative" than in 1916, e.g. suggesting that each corps hold two divisions in the front and two in reserve. On 30 May Gough moved his HQ to Lovie Chateau two miles outside Poperinghe, and the HQ was up and running by 2 June.

Much of the tactical discussion concerned how far the British infantry should realistically be expected to push. The immediate targets were the Black Line, just under  forward, the Green Line  further on and the Red Line  further. Gough agreed with Maxse's proposal (31 May) for attacks just before sunset (giving troops more rest prior to the attack, and the Germans less time to counterattack) and advancing further than the Black Line to the River Steenbeck. Gough agreed that opportunities had gone to waste at Arras (9 April) as the initial attack had not been pressed hard enough. At the next corps commanders' conference (6 June) Gough declared that "should the enemy be thoroughly demoralised during the initial attack, it might be possible to gain portions of the Red Line (at that stage still a second day's objective) during the first 24 hours," although he was keen to distinguish between a bold attack against a crumbling enemy and "an organized attack against ... organized resistance". A document circulated on 7 June stressed that platoon, company and battalion commanders were to be urged to act with initiative to seize ground, in the hope of repeating the successes of 1 July 1916 (the First Day of the Somme, on the southern part of the British line), 13 November 1916 (the first day of the Ancre) or 9 April 1917 (the first day of Arras). Simpson comments that as adequate field artillery support on the first day would only extend as far as the Green Line in places, "a repulse was almost inevitable" for those units which pushed on further, and that Gough still did not appear to realise that an offensive might stall because of stronger German resistance and counter-attacks, rather than from lack of initiative among junior officers.

Failure to exploit Messines
After his victory at Messines, and in accordance with prior plans, Plumer ordered II and VIII Corps to exploit German disorganisation by attacking the Gheluveld Plateau. When their patrols encountered resistance (8 June), Haig asked Plumer to launch this attack at once, instead of waiting three days to redeploy sixty heavy and medium guns as arranged. When Plumer, after consultation with his corps commanders, declined to be rushed in this way, Haig placed II and VIII Corps under Gough's command, ordering him to prepare to seize the area around Stirling Castle. Gough, despite being given Plumer's plan (9 June), did not then make any such attack, and at the next Army Commanders' Conference (14 June) stated that he had not wanted to push his men into the small salient which such an attack would achieve, and that he wished to attack the Gheluveld Plateau simultaneously with his main attack (Gough later described this as "a slight change of plan" and also claimed that he did not want to rush into an advance because of his experience at Bullecourt). Haig approved this, and stated at the conference that he hoped to capture Passchendaele–Staden–Klerken Ridge on 25 July. The failure to seize the Gheluveld Plateau (the German Army Group Commander, Crown Prince Rupprecht, had recorded in his diary on 9 June that the area might have to be abandoned) was to have unhappy consequences.

Besides the four divisions of II and VIII Corps (VIII Corps, still under Hunter-Weston, was soon moved out of the sector) Gough was also given another four of Plumer's divisions at the end of June, together with two from GHQ Reserve. Another six were transferred from Horne's First Army. (This makes a total of 16 divisions: Farrar-Hockley states that he also had a division in Army reserve, with another in GHQ Reserve close by). Plumer, now left with only 12 divisions, was also required to transfer half his artillery and all his tanks to Gough.

Final plans
The Germans had between five and seven (on the Gheluveld Plateau) defensive lines, and their positions had been strengthened since mid-June by Colonel von Lossberg. Intelligence reports, filed mistakenly with the Messines operations in the Australian War Memorial, show that Fifth Army was largely aware of the digging of the German defences throughout June.

After another corps commanders' conference on 26 June, results of the discussions were published as orders. Gough planned a four-phase attack across a front of : "a series of organised battles". First the enemy's front system (the crest of Pilckem Ridge and the edge of Shrewsbury forest on the Gheluveld Plateau) was to be taken, then the second line after a pause of 30 minutes. Army was to control artillery initially, which would then be delegated to corps an hour after the third objective had been taken. There would then, "without any settled pause" and "either immediately or within a few hours" be a fourth phase: an extra , taking the attackers to Passchendaele Ridge itself at Broodseinde, with the left flank along Gravenstafel spur to Gravenstafel and Langemarck (the Red Line). Although the strength of the fourth advance was to be left to the discretion of divisional commanders, Gough, in the words of the Official Historian, "instead of confining his first day’s operation to a short fixed advance, was in favour of going as far as he could", and more than twice as deep than Rawlinson and Plumer had earlier recommended. All available heavy artillery was to be ready to lay a protective barrage in front of the fourth objective, where Gough expected that resistance by German reserves would be met. However, if little opposition was met, a further advance was to be made that same afternoon to Passchendaele Village itself (technically a fifth objective, although not specifically numbered as such), an objective which Gough more realistically hoped to attain on the third or fourth day. Haig did not interfere, and Gough would later tell the Official Historian that Haig had hoped to reach the Belgian coast within a matter of weeks.

This would enable greater concentration of artillery fire, while attacking troops would be less disorganised and less vulnerable to counterattack, as well as being better able to maintain their morale and to be relieved by fresh troops, ready for an advance to the Red Line three days later. Although Davidson later wrote that Haig had seen and approved his memorandum, Haig's diary makes no mention of it. Gough's response to the memorandum declared himself "in agreement" with the "broad principles" of "a continuous succession of organised attacks" but criticised Davidson's suggestion that major attack could be mounted every three days, Gough thinking ten days a more realistic interval. Gough and Maxse (who wrote "BALLS!" on his copy of Davidson's paper) agreed with one another that opportunities for further advance should be taken, and blamed the failures at Arras after 11 April, on renewed attacks without adequate artillery preparation. By Davidson's later account, at a conference on 28 June, Plumer also favoured permitting local commanders to attempt a deeper advance. Gough would later claim (in the 1940s) that he had wanted a shallower advance but had been overruled by Haig and Plumer – this appears to be at best a false recollection, if not a lie.

Simpson wrote that Gough's wish to allow infantry to push forward was "more cautious than is usually supposed". Rawlinson was not involved in these discussions and his view that Gough wanted to go forward at the "Hurroosh" may well be more a comment on his knowledge of Gough's temperament than a strictly accurate description of Gough's plans by this stage.

Eve of the offensive
Haig briefed Gough (diary 28 June) that "the main advance" should be limited until the Gheluveld Plateau had been secured as far as Broodseinde. Haig was principally concerned that Gough was not giving sufficient weight to the attack on Gheluveld Plateau. Prior & Wilson write: "It is not evident that Gough allowed these views greatly to influence the disposition of his forces". The boundary of Fifth Army was extended south, placing another of Plumer's divisions under II Corps, so that Sanctuary Wood could be assaulted, lest the Germans there subject the attackers of the Gheluveld Plateau to enfilade fire. A XIV Corps memorandum states that they had sufficient high-explosive shell but insufficient heavy guns to bombard as thoroughly as they would have liked. Prior & Wilson point out that, had Gough followed Haig's advice to concentrate more weight against the Gheluveld Plateau, that would have reduced the effectiveness of the attack on his left and centre, but also argue that more heavy guns could have been obtained from Rawlinson's forces (threatening a diversionary attack along the Belgian Coast) and Plumer's Second Army (some of which was attacking the Gheluveld Plateau, but some of which was mounting largely fruitless diversionary attacks further south).

Rawlinson urged the CIGS Robertson (29 June) of "the desirability of holding on to Goughy's coat tails and ordering him only to undertake the limited objective and not going beyond the range of his guns". He repeated this advice to Haig over dinner (3 July) although he was concerned that Haig would not insist hard enough. Aylmer Haldane recorded in his diary (30 June 1917) his lack of keenness at going to Fifth Army and wrote that Gough was "very impetuous and difficult to get on with" as well as "excitable and thoughtless and impatient".

Another memo by Gough (30 June) raised the possibility that open warfare might be attained after 36 hours, although "this is a result which we can hardly hope to attain until the enemy has been beaten in two or three heavy battles." Haig annotated this to insist that the capture of Passchendaele–Staden Ridge, not just the defeat of the German forces, must be the object of the offensive. Gough expressed scepticism to Robertson and King George V when they visited Fifth Army Headquarters on 3 July about Haig's "illusion" that the advance would be rapid – he said "we would be lucky to reach Roulers in two months". Like Plumer, Gough believed that Haig was being fed an exaggerated picture of German weakness by his intelligence advisor Charteris.

In his instruction of 5 July, Haig ordered that Passchendaele–Staden Ridge was to be taken within weeks, and that thereafter a chance for the "employment of cavalry in masses is likely to occur" as they exploited towards Bruges, Roulers and Ostend. Haig hoped to reach Roulers by 7–8 August, in time for Fourth Army to catch the high tides for their coastal operations.

Pilckem Ridge

The bombardment began on 16 July. The battle was to have commenced on 25 July. Gough was granted three extra days for bombardment as it had taken longer than expected to get heavy artillery into place. A further delay was granted for General Anthoine (commanding the French Army on Gough's left flank) as bad weather was hampering his counter-battery programme. Haig noted in his diary (23 July) that three of the four British corps commanders (but not Jacob of II Corps) welcomed the delay for the same reason (Charteris later described the conference as "definitely heated" and Haig as "very moody" after he had to bow to their wishes for a further delay). Fifth Army intelligence at the time recorded weather conditions as "bad" and "poor" for much of the pre-31 July period (making it difficult for aircraft to spot German batteries behind Passchendaele Ridge and the Gheluveld Plateau, or for sound-ranging to operate in the prevailing westerly wind).

Walter Guinness wrote of the slipshod staff planning, engineering and signalling arrangements of Fifth Army in 1917: "None of the lessons taught by Plumer's success seem to have been learned." He recorded in his diary (23 July 1917) that there was "little confidence" in Gough.

On 31 July the attack was relatively successful on the left (Anthoine's French, Cavan's XIV Corps (which took its objectives up to the Black Line before running into counterattacks), and to some extent Maxse's XVIII and Watts' XIX (both of which reached beyond the Green Line in places, although they did not take St Julien, and were driven back to the Black Line by counterattacks in places), but less so in Jacob's II Corps attacking the Gheluveld Plateau, where counterbattery work had not been good enough to silence German artillery). Despite initial German concerns at the success of the British attack in the left and centre, the German counterattack was conducted by Eingreif divisions which had survived further back towards Passchendaele Ridge, and artillery operating from and behind Passchendaele Ridge and the Gheluveld Plateau. British infantry training had proven relatively effective, but German artillery and the poor light and state of the ground caused a breakdown in communications, making it hard to bring up reinforcements.

Edmonds later stressed in the Official History that after four days Gough's men were less than halfway to their first day objectives and had lost 30–60% of their fighting strength. Prior & Wilson point out that the attack had captured 18 square miles, including two of the German defensive lines on the left, at a cost of 27,000 casualties and inflicted approximately equal German casualties (as opposed to the First Day of the Somme, which had captured 3.5 square miles, for a cost of 57,000 British casualties, with minimal German losses). Ypres had been almost entirely removed from enemy observation. However, the attack had failed to capture the Gheluveld Plateau, and infantry pushing too far ahead had been vulnerable to counterattack. Farrar-Hockley writes that at the time "the results were not considered disappointing." John Lee writes that the results on 31 July were "mixed", with much of the ground taken lost, even on the first day, to "stupendous" counterattacks and that attempts to push forward after initial success led to "less than happy results". Andy Simpson writes of "the limited nature of the debatable success". It came on to rain on 31 July.

Early August
Gough had issued orders for II Corps to capture the Third objective (Tower Hamlets and Polygon Wood) on the Gheluveld Plateau, but at a Corps Commanders' conference on the evening of 31 July Jacob told him that this was not on, as the 30th Division had been pushed back to or just behind the first objective. Gough ordered II Corps to make a limited advance on the Gheluveld Plateau to reach the Black Line (the original second objective) on 2 August, while the other three corps were to retake the ground lost to counterattacks on 31 July and to reach the Green Line (the original third objective) on 4 August, and to take Langemarck, with the Red Line (the limit beyond which opportunist exploitation was not to pass) to be taken at a later date. Haig agreed.

Haig urged Gough (Haig diary 31 July) to stick to "the original plan" and consolidate the ground gained and prepare for the next advance "only after adequate bombardment and after dominating the enemy artillery". Davidson (1 August) objected to hurried preparations, the use of "part worn" troops, and recommended Gough wait for two or three days of good flying weather to allow "careful and accurate (artillery) shooting". Haig now agreed with Davidson, urging Gough (who, he claimed, "quite agreed") that he should concentrate on the Gheluveld Plateau and that he should wait for two or three days of dry weather for artillery and infantry to operate effectively (Haig diary 2 August).

Lunching with Gough on 5 August, six days after Third Ypres began, Rawlinson recorded that "he is converted from the "huroosh" and now accepts the limited objective as the normal tactics". Kiggell wrote to Gough (7 August) urging him "to jump well within our power" and to persuade the government, who had agreed to the offensive with deep reluctance on condition it would be conducted as a series of step-by-step advances, of "our power to win decisively" by "let(ting) them see that at each bound we gain the line aimed at and maintain it against counterattack, and with moderate losses". "Boche beating, not gain of territory. Beat him first, then en avant". Tanks were to be used to crush enemy strongpoints after the main attack had passed by.

In August there were only three days (7, 19, 22) in which no rain was recorded; rainfall for the month was almost double the August average. Much of the battlefield turned into a quagmire in which men and animals sometimes drowned, making movement of men and supplies difficult and severely reducing the accuracy and effectiveness of artillery.

Battle of Langemarck

Gough delayed his planned attacks for a week. During the 2–10 August delay, corps reserves had to be used to relieve exhausted units in the line, instead of being kept to exploit the attack. The 10 August attack was in good weather but after rain two days earlier, not giving the ground enough time to dry. The 18th and 25th divisions attacked the Gheluveld Plateau on 10 August, aiming to capture the second objective from 31 July. Part of the reason for the failure of the attack on Westhoek to hold ground east of the village, was that Gough had dispersed his artillery along the rest of his front in readiness for the next big push.

The 16 August attack was originally scheduled for 14 August but Gough, Farrar-Hockley claims under pressure from Haig to make rapid progress to link up with the planned seaborne landing, allowed Jacob a postponement of only one day. A thunderstorm forced another. Although Second Army artillery were providing some assistance on the Gheluveld plateau, much of their strength was being dissipated assisting the Battle of Hill 70, a First Army attack by the Canadian Corps at Lens.
Although Haig had urged concentration on the Gheluveld Plateau, at a conference at his house at Cassel (15 August) he "left this matter entirely to General Gough's discretion". The attack of 16 August was carried out across a wide front and after two days of heavy rain. The French on Gough's left, heavily equipped with artillery and facing weaker German defences, achieved their targets for a cost of only 350 casualties, while Cavan's XIV Corps on Gough's left also achieved its objectives against tired German forces which were in the process of being relieved. In the centre Gough's attacks were largely unsuccessful; the attacks on the Gheluveld plateau made initial progress but were driven back by counterattacks, without obtaining the second objective which had been the target on 10 August. Gough's forces suffered 15,000 casualties. Farrar-Hockley describes the 16 August attacks as "on balance a failure". Gough later claimed in his memoirs that he had visited Haig in his railway carriage twenty miles from Ypres and had advised him that "tactical success was not possible, or would be too costly under such conditions, and advised that the attack should now be abandoned" and that Haig had told him that with Russia dropping out of the war it was necessary for the BEF, the strongest Allied army at the moment, to wear down German strength, to prevent the Germans defeating France or Italy, as well as capturing the submarine bases and Gotha bomber bases and of the difficulties of persuading Lloyd George to see "the realities of the situation".

In the centre, the 16th (Irish) Division and 36th (Ulster) Division, both part of Watts' XIX Corps, had to attack fortified German farmhouses on Zonnebecke Ridge, not one of which had been subdued by artillery fire. When Gough accused the troops in question of not being able to hold onto their gains because they "were Irish and did not like the enemy's shelling", Haig was not impressed by Gough "playing the Irish Card" and noted that the men had been exhausted and that the bombardment had been ineffective. Gough later came to regret the "Irish card" comments when he learned the facts. He told one of his chaplains in late August that the heart had gone out of a part of Fifth Army.

Haig noted (diary 18 August) that "Failure to advance on the right centre" was caused by "Commanders being in too great a hurry" and that three more days should have been allowed to allow artillery to gain the upper hand – the same advice he had given before the battle but had not enforced. He demanded Gough get the facts and then "talk the matter over with him". There is no evidence of Gough thinking the same way: at a conference of his corps commanders (17 August), he noted the tendency of his men to be driven back by counterattacks, wanting to court martial some officers and NCOs for "glaring instances" of this, and also complained that divisions were being rotated too quickly through the line, which might risk Fifth Army "running out of men". Gough proposed a series of piecemeal operations: XVIII Corps were to attack on 19 August, XIX Corps on 21 August, then II Corps on 22 August, in each case to seize the objectives which they had failed to achieve on 16 August. XIV, XVIII and XIX Corps were then to attack on 25 August, followed by II Corps later on the same day. There would then be a general advance at some unspecified future date. This plan was then abandoned as XIX and II Corps did not have enough fresh troops to attack.

It was decided instead that Maxse's XVIII Corps would attack on 19 August, then XIV and II Corps on 22 August. The former attack was successful, capturing fortified farmhouses near St Julien which had caused difficulty on 16 August (as the farmhouses were on dry ground, Maxse was able to use twelve tanks, protected by a smoke barrage). The attack on 22 August was unsuccessful owing to the ineffectiveness of the bombardment and German counterattacks, with no ground at all being gained on the Gheluveld Plateau.

Rain began again on 23 August. On 24 August Gough's intelligence branch informed him that the German defences were not linear but consisted of strongpoints in a chequerboard formation, with many German units held back for counterattack. Gough issued a new paper Modifications Required in Our Attack Formations to Meet the Enemy's Present System of Defence (24 August) –with a greater percentage of "moppers-up" to deal with bypassed enemy strongpoints, while larger numbers of troops were employed to withstand counterattacks. These tactics ("waves" followed by "worms") were later demonstrated to Third Army on 14 September, although in Simpson's view Gough did not appear to have realised that artillery superiority was needed to use them effectively.

Plumer takes over
Haig then saw Plumer (25 August), the day after the German counterattacks which recaptured Inverness Copse, and informed him that II Corps would soon be returned to his command, and that his Second Army was to take the lead in the offensive, to take the Gheluveld Plateau with a more cautious and methodical approach. He saw Gough later the same day and informed him that he was to undertake subsidiary attacks to assist Plumer.

By 26 August the rain had become torrential. XVIII Corps attacks on the St Julien spur failed (27 August), while that day Inverness Copse (on the Gheluveld Plateau) resisted its fourth assault. Simpson writes that the large attacks on 27 August were, like those on 22 August, "no more successful than those before". Farrar-Hockley blames the attack on Haig's orders to "press the enemy" and on Neill Malcolm's "speaking savagely" to the corps commanders. The Official History writes that the attack resulted in "considerable further casualties and very little gain in ground". Plumer's biographer describes it as "a bloody fiasco" in which some of Gough's men were left standing up to their knees in water for up to ten hours before zero hour. Prior & Wilson write that Gough's troops were exhausted by now after repeated attacks. Gough ordered another attack for 31 August.

Haig ordered Gough (28 August) to hand over command of II Corps effective early September, although he initially permitted him to make further limited attacks in the region of Inverness Copse until then which would facilitate the upcoming big push, but otherwise to train and rest his divisions ready to assist Plumer. However, when Gough proposed (30 August) to take this region on 3 September, Haig withheld permission as the weather conditions were not suitable.

Rawlinson, who was highly sceptical about the likelihood of the campaign succeeding, told Wilson that the command change was being made because "even he (Haig) began to see that Goughie was quite unable to do the job" (Wilson diary 29 August and 5 September). Haig wrote (diary 7 September) "I decided to stop Gough from going on with ... little attacks" which Haig thought "wasteful".

In early September Gough ordered XIX Corps to make small-scale attacks in the St Julien area. Not one of the fortified farmhouses was captured, and after the fourth attack Haig remonstrated with Gough. However, Gough protested (Haig diary, 9 September) that two of the divisions were soon to leave the salient, and that for the sake of their "training and morale" they should be made to retake ground which they had recently lost to counterattacks. Haig permitted a fourth, equally unsuccessful attack on 10 September. Kiggell (Haig diary 10 September) reported that "some of Gough's subordinates" did not give an honest answer as to the likely success of attacks and remarked to Neil Malcolm of the order to make only limited attacks: "We did not expect you to pursue the matter so vigorously". Fanshawe – GOC V Corps, which had recently replaced Watts' XIX Corps in the line – was opposed to further attacks, while the other corps commander McKenzie, possibly put up to it by Gough, was in favour. Haig then interviewed the divisional commanders, then urged Gough to desist, which Gough agreed to do. Aylmer Haldane recorded in his diary (10 September) Lambton's lack of keenness at going to Fifth Army. Haig wrote (diary 18 September), after touring Fifth Army and corps HQ, that the Chief of Staff Malcolm seemed "fatigued" and that "Fifth Army staff work is not as satisfactory as last year."

Sidelined
Beginning on 20 September and into early October Plumer captured the Gheluveld Plateau, in drier weather and under cover of intense artillery fire (he had guns brought in from First, Third and Fourth Armies, and had twice as many guns for counter-battery alone as Gough had had for all purposes prior to 31 July), in a series of costly but effective set piece attacks (Menin Road – 20 September, Polygon Wood – 26 September, Broodseinde – 4 October). Fifth Army played a supporting role in Plumer's victory at Menin Road, making more use of new tactics: the "draw-net barrage" (which began  behind the German front line then drew back towards it, demoralising the defenders), using the Stokes Mortar as part of the creeping barrage, small columns of infantry following a wave of skirmishers and greater use of the rifle (as opposed to hand grenades) to repel counterattacks. Maxse also felt, ironically in view of the tactical debates of late June, that limiting the depth of the attack to  had been worthwhile. The Fifth Army portion of the attack was conducted by 9th (Scottish) Division and 55th Division (under V Corps); 20th (Light) Division (under XIV Corps), and 51st (Highland) Division & 58th Division (under XVIII Corps). John Lee observes that 9th Scottish and 58th London, which were new to Fifth Army, reached their objectives, whereas the others did not, suggesting that the men had probably been worn out by excessive time spent on trench duty and labouring tasks, adding that "the anecdotal evidence of soldiers preferring service in Second, or any other, Army than Fifth is hard to ignore."

With a breakthrough apparently imminent, Haig ordered (26 September) that forces for exploitation, including cavalry, be ready to exploit to Roulers by 10 October, ready to link up with the long-postponed coastal advance and seaborne landing. Gough protested that 16 October was a more realistic date (Plumer's suggestion was 13–14 October) but was over-ruled by Haig. Gough appears to have anticipated a dramatic exploitation by mounted cavalry, but marginal notes by Haig on a memo from Neill Malcolm (1 October) indicate that he had misunderstood the Commander-in-Chief's intent – Haig envisaged cavalry being used more cautiously at first, in a dismounted role, in the event of German resistance breaking, a far cry from the dramatic exploitation which had been anticipated at the Somme.

The rain then resumed. Edmonds later claimed in the Official History, that at a conference on 7 October Gough and Plumer urged "a closing down" of the campaign, but were over-ruled by Haig, who cancelled the plans for cavalry exploitation but ordered that Passchendaele Ridge be taken. Prior & Wilson point out that there is no documentary evidence for the existence of this conference, either in contemporary records or in Haig's diary, nor did Gough make any such claim in his memoirs, although it would have been in his interests to do so. Gough had written to H. A. Gwynne, editor of The Morning Post, on 6 October that he hoped the weather, although "wintry and rather wet", would hold long enough to permit further attacks.

During the night before First Passchendaele (12 October) Gough telephoned Plumer to suggest a postponement because of the foul weather, but Plumer, after consulting his corps commanders, decided to push on. Gough recommended to Kiggell that the final operation (Second Passchendaele, in which the Canadians played a key role) be delayed until frost had dried out the ground, but Haig vetoed Kiggell's suggestion of a conference with Gough and Plumer and demanded (diary 26 October) that Gough and Plumer inspect the front lines and then report back to him. The offensive went ahead as planned.

Rawlinson recorded "things had not been running at all smoothly" in Fifth Army Staff (Diary 11 and 13 October 1917). By late 1917 he recorded that "intense feeling against Goughy" had "made many enemies" and led to the "formation of a sect of officers called the GMG" which stood for "Gough must go" (Rawlinson Diary 14 October 1917 and 1 November 1917). Kiggell advised Haig to send the Canadians to Plumer not Gough as they did not "work kindly" with Gough as he "drove them too much in the Somme fighting last year" (Haig Diary 5 October 1917 & 8 November 1917). Haig (diary 5 October) blamed Malcolm for the Canadians' reluctance to serve under Gough.

In November Kiggell warned Haig "of the strong wish of divisions not to be sent to Gough's Army". Haig at first (8 November) thought it best "not to mention to Gough the state of feeling among the troops" lest it "might make Gough lose confidence in himself". After Passchendaele, Malcolm was moved to command of 66th Division. Lord Derby (Secretary of State for War) warned Haig (11 November and 12 December) of Gough's growing unpopularity, among Canadian troops and at home in the UK. Derby again warned Haig (23 December 1917) that he was hearing many criticisms in London of Gough's responsibility for the "failure" of Third Ypres. That month Robertson had intervened on Gough's behalf when Lloyd George had wanted to sack him for "being one of those responsible for perpetrating the massacres" of Third Ypres.

Spring 1918

Preparing the defence
Gough moved his HQ to Nesle (12 miles south of Peronne) in mid December 1917. In January 1918 Lt-Col Armitage recorded that in his meeting with Smuts and Hankey (who were interviewing senior British generals to assess their suitability to replace Haig as Commander-in-Chief) "Gough, compared with other army commanders, did not come convincingly out of that interview as his views were somewhat narrow and he failed to put before Smuts the perilous position on his front". Yet Smuts' own account of the meeting recorded that he learned more about conditions at the front from Gough than from other generals, while Hankey recorded that Gough was "a terrific fellow, oozing with character and Irish humour".

Haig, anxious to protect the Channel Ports, had concentrated his reserves further north, leaving Fifth Army – now redeployed back down to the Somme, the southern part of the BEF's line – to bear the brunt of the German Operation Michael offensive. The only defensive feature of note was the River Somme (which runs roughly north–south south of Peronne) in his rear, and the Crozat Canal connecting the Somme to the Oise. He had only eleven divisions (and 3 cavalry, equivalent in firepower to one infantry division) rather than the seventeen he demanded. 39th and 20th (Light) Division divisions, both in GHQ Reserve, were placed in his rear. Gough had to take over two more sections of line ( and  respectively) in mid January, leaving him holding  of front, (as opposed to Third Army to his north, which had 14 divisions to hold ).

At a corps commanders' conference on 3 February, Gough warned them that intelligence had deduced that von Hutier, who had recently taken Riga in September 1917, was opposite them. Edward Beddington acted as Fifth Army Chief of Staff until 10 February 1917, when Neill Malcolm's replacement Brigadier-General Jocelyn Percy became available. Beddington later wrote highly of Gough's active mind, "full of ideas, some excellent and some the reverse". Gough also badgered Haig and Petain (Anthoine, his old colleague from Third Ypres, was now Chief of Staff at French GQG) and was assured that Humbert's French Third Army at Clermont was earmarked to reinforce him.

Asking for reinforcements
A memorandum (4 Feb 1918) from Maj-Gen Davidson (Chief of Operations at GHQ) discussed the possibility of Gough having to fall back to positions defending the Somme Crossings, although he stressed that such a retreat would be bad for morale, but made no mention of Gough's lack of manpower. Davidson proposed building a fortified bridgehead around the Somme crossings at Brie and Peronne, and wanted Gough to fortify the River Tortille, which runs roughly northeast from Peronne to the Canal du Nord. A further request for reinforcements resulted in formal orders (9 February 1918) from Lt-Gen Herbert Lawrence (Chief of Staff BEF), ordering Gough to be prepared to conduct a fighting retreat and then conduct counterattacks – it may well be that although the German attack was expected it was thought it would be a subsidiary attack prior to an attack on the French in Champagne. Some extra labourers were made available. The total number of labourers in Fifth Army sector rose from 17,400 (30 December) to 24,217 (early February) to 48,154 by mid March (out of 354,577 in the BEF as a whole) but no more than 8,830 were ever available per week. Most of them were used to build roads, railways, depots, hospitals, water reservoirs – not fortifications.

Derby wrote to Haig (5 March) that Gough did "not have the confidence of the troops he commands", that Lloyd George had "spoken to (Haig) on the subject" and that his letter was an "indefinite order" which Haig could use as "a loophole" to remove Gough. It is unlikely that Derby, a Conservative, was much influenced by Liberal MPs who remembered the Curragh Incident, but he may well have been influenced by Henry Wilson. Lord Bertie (British Ambassador to Paris) suggested to Haig (5 March) that Gough be appointed Governor of Gibraltar. Haig ignored both suggestions.

Gough was active in inspecting units to encourage the construction of defences. When he visited Divisional HQ of 16th Irish Division on 14 March Maj-Gen Hull suggested strengthening the battle (second) zone, but Gough replied "The Germans are not going to break my line".

Haig inspected the front with Gough (7 March). From north to south Fifth Army then consisted of Congreve's VII Corps, Watts' XIX Corps (containing 66th Division now commanded by Neill Malcolm), Maxse's XVIII Corps and III Corps. The latter was commanded by Butler, recently removed as Deputy Chief of Staff BEF, and who had never before commanded a large formation in battle but was now holding the weakest part of the front. None of these corps had any division in reserve. Gough also requested that men from 20th (still in GHQ Reserve behind his front) and 50th Divisions be used to help dig defences, but this was vetoed by GHQ.

Gough had a reasonable idea of the size and timing of the German attack from air reconnaissance and interrogation of prisoners, although many at GHQ believed the attack would not be until a few days or weeks. Lawrence was in the habit of referring to Gough as "young Goughie", although the latter was his senior in rank Farrar-Hockley argues that Lawrence and Davidson were personally unsympathetic to Gough and in early 1918 effectively starved him of reinforcements which Haig might, if asked, have agreed to send. He argues that Gough ought to have demanded to speak to Haig personally, which was his right but not the etiquette of the time. On the evening of Tuesday 19 March Lawrence ("purring on the telephone like a damned pussycat") once again refused permission to move up the 20th and 50th Divisions.

21 March
The German attack began at 4:40 am on 21 March; Gough, Beddington and other rear echelon officers recorded being awakened at around 5:10 am, when British artillery, hampered by the fog, began to return fire. The Germans had over 8,000 guns and trench mortars. Much of the German bombardment (described by eyewitnesses as "a wall of orange flame" and "a sea of fire") concentrated on British headquarters and communications, while pauses were left in the bombardment of the British front lines to tempt the defenders out of their shelters. Gas was also used, although mustard gas was not used in areas through which German troops were to pass. 19 German divisions assaulted six of Byng's Third Army, while 43 German divisions attacked Fifth Army (13 divisions plus 2 in GHQ Reserve). Many British divisions were at little more than half strength, and none more than two-thirds, giving the Germans a 4:1 numerical superiority on Byng's front and over 8:1 on Gough's.

At 8:30 am Gough ordered the 20th and 50th Divisions to be ready to move up to the front, and obtained retrospective permission from GHQ. Gough spent the morning at his own headquarters listening to reports as they came in – III Corps forward zone was already reported overrun by 10 am – and reading reports of the rounding up of labourers and pioneers into ad hoc fighting units, as he would have been putting himself out of communication had he attempted to tour the front. At around 1 pm General Humbert arrived, telling Gough that he had only a skeleton staff but no troops to send (je n'ai que mon fanion – "I've only the pennant on my car"), and promising to lobby GQG to send French divisions. At 2 pm, after studying aerial reconnaissance reports (the fog had cleared enough by 12:30 pm for British planes to be launched), Gough ordered the corps commanders to begin a fighting retreat, described by Beddington as "a right and brave decision arrived at very quickly". He was disinclined to speak to Lawrence or Davidson again, and disappointed not to hear directly from Haig himself that day. In the afternoon he visited his corps commanders one by one. Formal orders to fall back were issued at 9:45 pm. Haig (diary 21 March) approved Gough's withdrawal. Haig (diary 21 March) appears to have regarded the initial day's fighting as a creditable result, knowing as he did that the first day was often the most successful of any offensive, and GHQ (from their 2 March appraisal) appear to have believed that the main German effort would fall somewhere else, perhaps against the French in Champagne.

To avoid a repetition of the chaos of the August 1914 retreat, Gough took particular care to order that corps headquarters retreat to spots which he had selected (sited on existing signal cables) and keep a tight grip on the location of their division headquarters. That evening he spoke to Lawrence on the telephone, who told him that the Germans were unlikely to attack again the next day as they would be too busy reorganising their tired troops and collecting their wounded – Gough claimed to have "emphatically" disagreed, and that evening Haig agreed to send a second division being moved down from Flanders – one was already on its way – to Gough's sector.

Martin Kitchen takes a rather different point of view, arguing that Haig was misled by Gough's overly favourable report. Haig therefore did not ask the French for reinforcements until after midnight of 21/22 March, and then asked for only three divisions – half what had been agreed under "Hypothesis A" – which reached the British line on 23 March. Following Haig's request, Petain agreed to send two divisions and some dismounted cavalry under General Pelle to cover the French left flank. This news reached Gough the following morning. On the evening of 21 March Petain, having heard that Butler's III Corps had been unable to hold the line of the Crozat Canal the previous evening, had also at last agreed that French 125th Division be deployed to III Corps sector.

22–25 March
At 10:45 am on 22 March, following a telephone request from Congreve for clarification of his previous verbal instructions, Gough issued written orders to corps commanders to retreat "in the event of serious hostile attacks" the forward line of the Rear Zone ("the Green Line" in front of the Somme – in practice little more than a line of signposts and wire). Fifth Army staff also informed corps commanders of the impending French reinforcement and Gough's hopes to withdraw III Corps to form a reserve. On receiving these messages at around noon, Maxse ordered XVIII Corps to withdraw immediately, without cover of artillery fire, and they fell back behind the Somme altogether that evening. Gough attempted to halt Maxse's withdrawal when he heard of it, but it was too late. Maxse's precipitate retreat allowed a German penetration at Bethencourt on his left flank, forcing Watts XIX Corps on his left to fall back also. Watts' falling back in turn jeopardised V Corps (part of Byng's Third Army) still holding the Flesquières Salient.

London was soon awash with exaggerated rumours, based largely on accounts of stragglers and chaos in rear areas, that Fifth Army had broken. Haig at last visited Gough on 23 March, meeting his requests for reinforcements with a laconic "well, Hubert, you can't fight without men," but wrote in his diary of his dismay that Fifth Army had "gone so far back without making some kind of stand". At 4 pm on 23 March Haig and Petain met at Dury. Petain agreed to deploy his Reserve Army Group (GAR – two armies under Fayolle) to operate in the Somme Valley. Gough was ordered to hold the line of the Somme (roughly north–south south of Peronne) "... at all costs. There will be no withdrawal...." and informed that as of 11 pm on Sunday 24 March Fifth Army would be placed under Fayolle's orders, making the Somme (roughly east–west between Amiens and Peronne) the Anglo-French boundary. VII Corps, north of the bend in the Somme, was placed under Third Army's orders at the end of 24 March.

Bertie recorded (24 March), somewhat prematurely, that Haig had saved Gough's job. By 24 March the Germans had broken through into open country, although officers on the ground were organising stragglers and rear echelon troops into scratch formations. Reinforcements (1st Cavalry Division on Gough's left to maintain contact with Third Army, 35th Division down from Flanders into VII Corps sector, and Robillot's II French Cavalry Corps (whose formations were in fact mainly infantry) in XVIII Corps sector) were beginning to take their place in Gough's line. On Gough's right III Corps were now under the command of General Pelle, but its units were becoming interspersed with French units as Butler had been attempting to withdraw them, and had lost control of the situation.

Herbert Lawrence visited Fifth Army on 24 March (Haig was visiting Byng's Third Army that day) and reported that it had "still plenty of life" despite shortage of numbers, and that Gough was planning a counterattack by four British brigades and 22nd French Division against a bridgehead which the Germans had made over the Somme at Pargny (threatening a breach between Watts' and Maxse's Corps).

The planned counterattack did not take place as General Robillot refused to co-operate, despite a personal visit from Maxse on the morning of 25 March, and Watts' Corps had to fall back from the line of the Somme. Gough spent much of that day visiting Maxse and Watts, and reconnoitring the ground east of Amiens which his troops would have to hold next. Gough ordered 2,000 rear echelon troops – mainly engineers (including 500 Americans), tunnellers, and signallers – to be formed into a unit under temporary command of Maj-Gen PG Grant, Fifth Army Chief Engineer, to work on the defences and fight if necessary. Brigadier-General Carey, due to return from leave on the afternoon of the 26th to take command of a division, was notified that he was instead to take command of this force, to be known as "Carey's Force".

26 March
Gough was not invited to the Army Commanders' meeting 11 am on 26 March, at which Haig told Plumer, Horne and Byng that Amiens was to be held "at all costs" until the French were in a position to give more support.

Brigadier-General Sandilands later recorded that, returning from leave, in the chaos he was unable to locate his brigade (104th Brigade, part of 35th Division), or even find out which corps it was currently part of. Making his way to Fifth Army Headquarters on 26 March by asking a lift from a man who knew him by sight, he found Gough having his teeth examined, but decided "discretion was the better part of valour" and beat a hasty retreat from the room. At about 11am a car drew up containing Milner and Wilson, now CIGS, who asked whether it was safe to drive into Amiens. Sandilands pointed out that Gough was in the building, assuming that they would wish to speak to him, but Wilson replied "Oh he is here is he? Well good morning" and drove off. Sandilands thought "that's the end of Gough". He later realised that they had been on their way to the Doullens Conference at which Foch was appointed generalissimo.

At the Doullens Conference that afternoon Wilson suggested to Haig that Rawlinson and his staff, currently at Versailles, could replace Gough (in the Official History Edmonds openly blamed Wilson for Gough's dismissal, so that he could remove Rawlinson, "a strong man" from Versailles). Petain (who, according to Haig had "a terrible look. He had the appearance of a commander who had lost his nerve") said of Gough's Fifth Army "Alas it no longer really exists ... From the first they have refused to engage the enemy ... they have run like the Italians at Caporetto". This was an exaggeration, and angered even the Francophile Henry Wilson. Petain told the meeting that 24 French divisions (at another meeting at Compiegne the previous day he had given the figure as 15 divisions) were en route to prevent a German breakthrough to Amiens.

By 26 March Gough had received a British infantry division from Italy, as well as three Australian and one New Zealand Divisions. Maxse was maintaining his place in the line, despite pressure from the French to join them in retreating south-westwards. Gough had to send a messenger, Paul Maze, to Humbert's headquarters, with orders to get back XVIII Corps artillery which had been lent temporarily to the French, with orders not to leave until he had obtained written orders for its return. Gough spent much of the afternoon with Watts, whose sector was also being strongly attacked. Gough returned to his headquarters, now moved back from Villers-Bretonneux to Dury, for a meeting with Foch (who was also establishing his own headquarters at Dury) and Weygand at 4 pm. Speaking in French, Foch demanded to know why Gough was not in the front line himself, why Fifth Army was falling back, and why there was no defence as at First Ypres in 1914. Gough thought him "peremptory, rude and excited", but such a manner was common in French generals, whose subordinates also sometimes answered back in similar vein. Gough telephoned Haig to complain, adding that French troops were falling back at a much faster rate than his own. Haig recorded that Gough complained that Foch had been "most impertinent" to him. After meeting with Gough, Foch saw Fayolle (Reserve Army Group commander) and was rather more civil to him.

At 5 pm, after the Doullens conference, Haig met Milner and Wilson – he recorded that he told them that no matter what opinion at home might think, or what Foch had just said, he thought Gough "had dealt with a most difficult situation very well. He had never lost his head, was always cheery and fought hard."

On the evening of 26 March Gough telephoned Lawrence to say that the Germans were weakening and often falling back in the face of local counterattacks, and that with three fresh divisions (he had in reserve only two composite battalions and a Canadian motor machine-gun battery, which he had had to send to Watts' sector) he could push them back to the Somme. He recorded that "Lawrence laughed and said it was good to hear that we had plenty of fight still left, though no reinforcements at the moment could be sent." In fact Byng's Third Army had been prioritised for reinforcements, and had been sent seven divisions since 22 March.

Dismissed
Bertie recorded (27 March) that Haig himself might be sacked instead of Gough. Gough spent much of 27 March with Watts, who was still facing strong German attacks although beginning to drive them back with counterattacks, and then with Maxse whose XVIII Corps was about to be relieved by French troops coming into the line. He returned to his HQ at about 5 pm, to find Haig's Military Secretary Maj-Gen Ruggles-Brise, who informed him to his surprise that he was to be relieved of command of Fifth Army and was to hand over command to Rawlinson the following day.  

Gough had to deal with a final crisis as the Germans were crossing the east–west portion of the Somme at Cerisy, threatening XIX Corps rear. Byng, on hearing this news had moved 1st Cavalry Division south of the Somme and returned it to Gough's command pending the arrival of 61st Division by hastily organised motor transport. Gough eventually telephoned Foch at 3am on 28 March to ask permission for Watts to withdraw further, although he later regretted not having simply made the decision on his own authority. XIX Corps and Carey's Force were able to hold the Stop Line on 28 March.

Gough handed over command to Rawlinson at 4:30 pm on 28 March. Beddington and other staff officers remained to ease the transition. Over dinner (29 March) Haig told Gough that he wanted him out of the line, along with a Reserve Army staff, to prepare an east–west line of defence along the Somme from Amiens to the sea (in case the Germans broke through and the BEF had to form a defensive perimeter around the Channel Ports). Gough set up Reserve Army HQ at Crecy on 3 April – this would later form the nucleus of the reconstituted Fifth Army under Birdwood (remnants of Gough's previous army were now renamed the Fourth and under Rawlinson).

Haig defended Gough to Lloyd George during a car journey (3 April) – he recorded that Lloyd George was looking for a scapegoat for the manpower problem and for his attempts to redeploy divisions to the Middle East contrary to Robertson's advice, and that Lloyd George demanded Gough's dismissal on the grounds that he had neither held nor destroyed the Somme bridges. Haig, by his own account, replied that "could not condemn an officer unheard" and refused to sack him unless given a direct order to do so. The next day (4 April) Haig received a telegram from Lord Derby ordering that Gough be dismissed altogether on the grounds of "having lost the confidence of his troops". Haig held a farewell lunch with Gough on 5 April.

However, he had averted a complete disaster. Andrew Roberts offers a favourable assessment of Gough's contribution:

Martin Kitchen takes a more critical view, pointing out that troops were initially under orders not to retire from the forward zone, that there were no adequate lines of communications between corps, and that Gough caused further trouble by issuing orders direct to lower formations, even down to brigade level. Gough "muddle(d) through ... to the limit of his very modest abilities".

Disgrace and after

Scapegoat
Lord Derby (Secretary of State for War) informed the War Cabinet (4 April) that he was demanding a full report on the recent reverse suffered by Fifth Army.

Gough visited Derby (8 April) to ask about an inquiry – he recorded that Derby was "pleasant enough, almost genial", but appeared glad when the interview was over. In the House of Commons Lloyd George (9 April) refused to rule out a court martial for Gough, praised General Carey for forming an ad hoc force to hold back the enemy in the Fifth Army sector, apparently unaware that the initiative had come from Gough when Carey was still on leave, and praised Byng (GOC Third Army) for only retreating when forced to do so by Fifth Army's retreat, apparently unaware of Byng's folly in clinging to the Flesquières Salient. Byng wrote to the editor of the Daily Express (19 April) that Gough was "talking too much and had better keep quiet".

Lloyd George told the War Cabinet (11 April) that the Liberal War Committee (a committee of backbench MPs) had made "very serious protests" to him that afternoon against the retention of "incompetent" officers like Gough and Haking.

When the War Cabinet demanded a progress report into the inquiry into the Fifth Army debacle (1 May), General Macdonogh (Director of Military Intelligence) reminded them the following day that the Under-Secretary of State had recently informed the House of Commons that, with the German Spring Offensives still in progress, the Government thought it unwise to put pressure on Haig.

After Lloyd George survived the Maurice Debate (9 May) with a misleading speech, Gough wrote to Lord Milner (now Secretary of State for War), in the hope that an inquiry into the Fifth Army would reveal the lack of reserves, only to receive a reply from the Under-Secretary that he was "mistaken" in thinking that there had been a promise of an inquiry (it is unclear whether this was an error or a deliberate lie). A furious Gough wrote to a friend in June that none of the other Army Commanders would have had the resilience to handle such a massive German attack, and that he "never wanted to wear the uniform of England again". He resisted the temptation to breach King's Regulations by airing his views in public as Maurice had done or to brief Opposition MPs.

Haig in fact wrote to his wife (16 June) claiming that "some orders (Gough) issued and things he did were stupid" (it is unclear to what Haig was referring) and claiming that he would "stick up for him as I have hitherto done" although he had not in fact specifically done so in his report of 12 May, in which he had blamed the German crossing of the Oise on the fog and the low level of the water owing to the recent dry weather. Haig also (letter of 6 July, replying belatedly to a letter of Gough's of 21 June) claimed that he had defended Gough from political criticism throughout the winter of 1917–18 and advised him to keep quiet so that he could be restored to an active command when memories had faded. In August, stung by a letter from Lord Roberts' widow that he owed a duty to protect the reputation of the men of Fifth Army, Gough had an interview with Lord Milner, who blamed the events of March on poor defence, incompetent leadership and the reluctance of the troops to fight, and bluntly refused to help.

Rehabilitation
Press reports of the events of March 1918 appeared in the National Review and the Illustrated Sunday Herald in October 1918, while officers and men returning after the Armistice were able to challenge claims that the Fifth Army had been defeated because morale had been poor and the soldiers had lacked confidence in Gough's leadership (although in practice few front line soldiers would have known the name of their Army Commander). At a dinner on board his train in February 1919 Haig confessed to Edward Beddington that he agreed that Gough's treatment had been "harsh and undeserved" but that "public opinion at home, whether right or wrong, (had) demanded a scapegoat" and he had been "conceited enough to think that the Army could not spare" himself rather than Gough – Beddington agreed that this had been the correct decision at the time.

Beddington later complained to Haig that he had only given Gough "faint praise" in his Final Despatch, and that he had been "fobbed off" with a GCMG instead of being promoted to field marshal and being given a cash grant. Haig was angry, although he later invited Gough to his home at Bemersyde to repair their relations.

Gough was not in London for the peace ceremonies (he was on a business trip to Baku), and it is unclear whether he knew that he was one of the senior officers (including Robertson and Hamilton) whom Lloyd George deliberately did not invite.

A further official statement in March 1919 declared that "the matter was now closed". However, in May 1919 Gough received a handwritten note from the new Secretary of State for War, Winston Churchill (Edmonds – Official History 1918 Vol II p. 119 – attributes the letter wrongly to Churchill's predecessor Lord Milner), praising the "gallant fight of the Fifth Army" and promising to consider Gough for "command appropriate to (his) rank and service". Gough was initially angry that this was not a full exoneration and implied that he might be employed in his permanent rank of lieutenant-general (not as an acting full general, the rank he had held at the time of his dismissal), but eventually accepted because of the praise given to Fifth Army.

Baltic Mission
He was appointed Chief of the Allied Military Mission to the Baltic (see United Baltic Duchy) on 19 May 1919. The British forces consisted solely of a squadron of cruisers. Britain hoped that the White forces would overthrow the Bolsheviks, but was not sure which side would triumph, and British policy was to encourage independence for Russia's subject peoples (which the Whites privately did not want). Gough was privately briefed by the Foreign Secretary Lord Curzon not to let Churchill push him into intervention, and not to let troops supported by England (sic) occupy Petrograd, which might cause friction with future Russian governments. Gough struck up good relations with the White leader General Yudenich and with the Baltic leaders, but urged the other nationalities not to attack Russia, causing the Finns to back off from their plans to march on Petrograd. The Iron Division (German troops under von der Goltz, occupying Lithuania and Latvia) also backed off from their plans to attack Russia, and after initial attempts to defy British demands were persuaded by Gough's firm stand (firmer, in fact, than that of the authorities in London) to depart for Germany by rail. However, White Russian opinion was angered by the independence of the Finns and Balts, and émigré groups in London, both imperialist and social democrat, put it about that Gough was in the pay of the Bolsheviks, while gossips also talked again of his "responsibility" for Third Ypres. Gough was once again sacked at the Prime Minister's insistence on 25 October 1919 and returned home, and neither sought nor was offered further military employment. He was awarded the GCMG in 1919.

Gough was a signatory to joint statement issued with other officers and advisors who had served in Russia, who on 23 February 1920 indicated their support of peace between the British and the Bolshevik Russia.

Gough retired from the Army as a full general on 26 October 1922, although owing to an administrative error he was initially told that he would receive the pension of a full colonel, his substantive rank as of August 1914.

Possible political career
As he had now become convinced of the merits of Home Rule he declined an offer to stand as an Ulster Unionist for a Belfast seat in the November 1918 General Election, despite an interview with Carson whom he found more "broadminded" in private than the uncompromising speeches which he was delivering in public.

Gough's name was proposed to the Cabinet early in 1921 by William O'Brien as a potential Lord Lieutenant of Ireland (in succession to French). Nothing came of this, but he stood unsuccessfully as an Asquith Liberal (i.e. opposed to Lloyd George's coalition government) in the 1922 Chertsey by-election. During the campaign he stressed his opposition to the policy of reprisals which had been employed in Ireland. Gough would later decline further attempts to persuade him to stand for Parliament in the 1922 General Election.

After the May 1929 General Election he recorded his dislike of the "fierce old women who support, and in large part constitute, the Tory Party" and of the "arrogant audacity" with which they appropriated the Union Jack as a party symbol. However, in March 1931 he declined another offer to stand for Parliament as a Liberal, not least because of his dislike of Lloyd George, who was now Liberal leader.

Later life

Farming and business career
Gough initially (August 1918) found that his recent "difficulties" in France would make it difficult for him to pick up company directorships. In October 1918 he attended an agriculture course at Cambridge University, most of the other students being wounded or invalided officers, and was there when the armistice was announced. In November 1918 he went on an expedition to Armenia, on behalf of a merchant banker, to investigate the affairs of a British company there.

With four daughters to support, from the summer of 1920 (i.e. after his return from the Baltic) Gough attempted to earn his living as a pig and poultry farmer at Burrows Lea at Gomshall in Surrey. He also became a director of the Ashley Trading Company, initially selling US-manufactured wallpaper paste in Britain. In 1925–26 he bought land in Kenya with a view to moving out there, but thought better of it, in part because so much of his time was taken up with the affairs of Fifth Army veterans, and also because his farm in Surrey was not succeeding as he had hoped. He sold Burrows Lea in 1927.

The reputation which Gough had won on his commercial trip to Baku in 1919 enabled him to obtain several directorships, including Siemens Brothers and Caxton Electrical Development Company. After the economic downturn, coupled with poor performance by junior managers, led to the bankruptcy of several smaller companies of which he was a director, he exercised a much more hands-on management than was normal for directors. His business interests included slate quarries in Wales and the supply of electrical equipment in Warsaw. He was also involved in the management and fundraising of King's College Hospital and St Mary's Hospital, London. As late as 1950, aged eighty, he was still chairman of Siemens Brothers, and a chairman or director of nine other companies.

Battle of the memoirs
The war correspondent Philip Gibbs, freed of the constraints of wartime censorship, wrote in Realities of War (1920) of the incompetence of British generals and of their staffs, the latter having "the brains of canaries and the manners of Potsdam". His main target was Gough's Fifth Army, although he wrote highly of Plumer and Harington's leadership of Second Army.

The Fifth Army in France in 1918 by Walter Shaw Sparrow (1921) gave some indication of the strain of the battle which Fifth Army had borne, although the book, written at the time of the Irish War of Independence, tended to denigrate the 16th (Irish) Division at the expense of the 36th (Ulster) Division. Gough thought Sparrow "a fine old fighter".

Part II of Churchill's World Crisis appeared in 1927, and praised Gough's role in March 1918. In March 1930 Gough was approached by Lord Birkenhead to assist with the writing of a chapter on the March 1918 crisis in his forthcoming book Turning Points in History. Over dinner Birkenhead discussed how Haig had "completely lost the confidence" of the British War Cabinet by the end of 1917, and how in Birkenhead's opinion – which Gough did not share – Petain's alleged entreaties had been "lie(s) and bluff" by the "d-d French" which did not justify a continuation of the Third Ypres Offensive. The book was published in October 1930 (after Birkenhead's death) and the book's praise of Gough's handling of the March 1918 Offensive was widely quoted in newspaper reviews.

Gough's conduct of the Somme and Third Ypres was strongly criticised by the Australian Official Historian Bean (1929 and 1933). Gough angrily denied Bean's account of the events at Pozières in July 1916 (Edmonds, the British Official Historian, had passed on his comments to Bean in 1927) and Bean's claim (in the 1916 volume, published 1929) that he was "temperamentally" prone to hasty attacks without proper reconnaissance.

After the publication of Birkenhead's essay, and the news that his old colleague Maj-Gen Sir George Aston was earning good money as a newspaper correspondent, Gough wrote his own account The Fifth Army (1931). He approached the King's adviser Lord Stamfordham as to whether His Majesty would be willing to mark the anniversary of March 1918 with a public tribute to the Fifth Army, only to be brushed aside by another Royal adviser Clive Wigram with the news that the King would prefer Gough, like Haig, not to write his memoirs. In the end the book was a great success. Gough was dissuaded from sending a copy to the King, but sent a copy to the Prince of Wales, receiving a handwritten note in reply. The book was ghosted by the novelist Bernard Newman. He made no mention of his dispute with Walker on 18 July 1916, although he pointedly omitted him from a list praising officers commanding Australian formations. Gough claimed that he had often vetoed attacks by subordinates if he thought them under-prepared, on too narrow a front, or in inadequate strength – Sheffield & Todman argue that this was a deliberate answer to Bean's charges. Writing about the Tavish Davidson memorandum of June 1917, he claimed that he had wanted to attack in shorter jumps (a claim not supported by contemporary documents) but that Plumer had insisted on going all-out for a deep objective on the first day. Gough also claimed that the delay in launching Third Ypres (from 25 July to 31 July 1917) wasted good weather and "was fatal to our hopes" – this is untrue. The relevant chapters were also published separately as The March Retreat (1934).

The Somme volume of the British Official History (1932) contained some guarded criticism of Gough.

In the mid-1930s the volume of Lloyd George's memoirs covering Third Ypres was published. During the ensuing newspaper correspondence Lloyd George quoted Gough's name in an attack on Haig, causing Gough to write to the newspapers in Haig's defence. Ahead of the publication of the 1918 volume, Gough dined twice with Lloyd George and his historical adviser Liddell Hart. Gough was initially impressed by the former Prime Minister's charisma, and was almost persuaded that he had had nothing to do with his sacking in April 1918, until he remembered that both Esher and Birkenhead had told him the truth years earlier. Lloyd George, who may well have been keen to appease a potential critic, eventually sent Gough a letter (described as "carefully worded" by Farrar-Hockley) claiming that new facts had come to his attention since that date, and admitting that Gough had been "let down" and that "no General could have won that battle".

In 1936 Gough complained to Liddell Hart that Haig had dominated his Army Commanders instead of taking them into his confidence and discussing matters, a view later made much of by the Canadian academic Tim Travers – Sheffield points out that this view not only needs to be treated with caution (Haig in fact held regular conferences) but sits ill with the evidence of Gough’s own command habits. He complained to Edmonds (in 1938) that other Army and corps commanders did not issue enough detailed guidance to their subordinates.

Final military service
Gough's colleagues continued to lobby the Government for him to receive an award (e.g. promotion to field marshal, a peerage and/or a cash grant) similar to that given the other army commanders at the end of the war. The Prime Minister Stanley Baldwin declined to do so in response to a Question in the Commons (10 November 1936), although he acknowledged that Gough's reputation had been vindicated. After further lobbying (in part by Master of the Rolls Wilfred Greene, a former major on Gough's staff) Gough was turned down for a GCB in King George VI's Coronation Honours in 1937, but was eventually given the award in the Birthday Honours of the same year. His GCB was seen as official rehabilitation.

From 1936 until 1943, Gough was honorary colonel of the 16th/5th The Queen's Royal Lancers, at the insistence of the regiments concerned, despite some resistance from the War Office because of his role in the Curragh Incident.

In the summer of 1938 Gough was invited by Hitler to visit a Nuremberg Rally, but declined as the Foreign Office refused to give him formal approval and advice (General Ian Hamilton accepted a similar invitation while visiting Berlin on behalf of the British Legion). In 1939, prior to the outbreak of war, Gough was initially appointed a "conducting officer" to supervise the evacuation of women and children to Kent and Sussex, but was asked to resign after it was pointed out that to use a distinguished general in this role was a gift to German propaganda. He later rejoined the organisation as a "duty officer" (an administrative role in London) and also served as a member of an "emergency squad" standing by to give assistance in the event of air raids, while continuing to write newspaper articles. In March 1940 he visited the French Army, where he met General Gamelin and inspected part of the Maginot Line – he was unimpressed by the French troops he saw, and thought effort had been wasted on fortifications which could have been used on training.

In May 1940 Gough joined the LDV (Home Guard) and was put in command of the Chelsea Home Guard, which he organised from scratch. News of his efficient performance reached Churchill's ears, and in June 1940 he was soon promoted to Zone Commander Fulham & Chelsea, in command of parts of Fulham and Victoria, but declined further promotion as he wished to enjoy his last chance of hands-on leadership of a military unit. A blind eye was turned to Gough's age (the official upper age limit was 65) until August 1942, when he was at last asked to retire. By now he was suffering from arthritis, which would eventually see him walk with sticks and then become a wheelchair-user.

Gough helped to found, and was president of, the Irish Servicemen's Shamrock Club, which opened in March 1943 off Park Lane, London W.1, with a grant of £1,000 from Guinness.

Third Ypres and the Official History
The volume of the Official History covering Third Ypres went through several drafts and did not appear until 1948, by which time the Official Historian Edmonds was in his late eighties. Gough, then in his mid-seventies, and remembering events of thirty years earlier with limited access to documents, lobbied hard to have himself shown in a better light, arguing that Haig had put verbal pressure on him to achieve a breakthrough towards Roulers.

Edmonds wrote to Wynne, the author of the relevant volume, (17 February 1944) "Gough was out to fight and get forward. He had no idea how to conduct the action Haig required and would not take advice. I heard him complain that the troops had no "blood lust", the officers no "spirit of the offensive". In the same letter Edmonds repeated the story of how Gough had once come into the officers' mess at Fifth Army HQ and demanded that two officers be shot as an example. In this draft Wynne suggested Gough had been overly ambitious to break through over a wide front, despite Haig's orders at the Doullens Conference (7 May 1917) to "wear down the enemy and have an objective" (the objectives in this case being Passchendaele–Staden Ridge and then the coast) and Haig restrained him. Wynne agreed that Haig had originally intended a breakthrough, but wrote that he had learned from Davidson that Haig had changed his mind after his meeting with the politicians (25 June), after which he had issued renewed orders (30 June) for Gough to "wear down the enemy" but "have an objective". Wynne argued that Gough had placed too much emphasis on the "objective" rather than the "wearing down".

Gough objected to this claim and said that Haig had told him to aim for a breakthrough at the 28 June conference. He also pointed out that a sleeper roadway earmarked for exploiting cavalry had been prepared long before he had been appointed to command the offensive and that appointing him (a "thruster") was evidence of Haig's desire for ambitious objectives. Gough also objected to Wynne's claim that he should have foreseen a wet August. In fact the weather seems to have broken unusually early that year.

After seeing Wynne's draft Gough (correspondence with Edmonds, 1944) claimed that Haig had been responsible for too narrow and weak an initial thrust and that Haig's "personal explanations" at the time urged Gough "to capture the Passchendaele Ridge and advance as rapidly as possible on Roulers (if possible on the first day)", which lay  behind the German front line [actually ] and thereafter on Ostend with the Fourth Army on the coast covering his left and "very definitely ... an attempt to break through and moreover Haig never altered this opinion until the attack was launched as far as I know. He confirmed this general idea on several occasions." Gough also scoffed at the implication that Haig had disapproved of his breakthrough attempt but had done nothing to stop it, and that even the corps commanders had warned of Gough's mistakes. Edmonds blamed the influence of Tavish Davidson on Wynne. Neill Malcolm, formerly Gough's chief of staff, called the 1943 draft "a farrago of malicious nonsense" (he objected particularly to Wynne's suggestion that Gough was allowed both to execute his attacks as he saw fit and to dictate to his corps commanders, without interference from Haig) and wrote that "Haig decided that he wanted a breakthrough and Charteris was always telling him that the Germans were on the verge of cracking. The breakthrough was the policy."

Gough denied that Haig had firmly told him to capture the Gheluveld Plateau over lunch on 28 June but it is in Haig's diary. He also accused Cavan of inventing a claim that he had begged Gough to let II Corps "bang through on the right" and a footnote to that effect was deleted from the History, although Cavan's claim is in fact confirmed by letters at the time; Percy Beddington, then GSO1 of a division, later chief of staff Fifth Army, later felt that Gough should have devoted a further two divisions to attacking the Gheluveld Plateau. Gough claimed that it was he who had realised the mistake.

Gough also criticised Haig for a poor choice of battlefield, "the worst possible for an offensive operation" – he said Haig should have attacked at Cambrai (Edmonds accepted that attacks of some kind were necessary and felt that Flanders was the best spot, contrary to Gough's opinion), for having a poor team around him (Charteris, Davidson, Lawrence, Kiggell) and for his top-down management style, claiming that Haig issued orders instead of gathering commanders and staff officers to thrash out the issues around a table. Gough also claimed that any entries in Haig's diary urging a step-by-step advance had been "written up after the event".

When told of Gough's criticisms Wynne wrote that "both Pilckem and Langemarck were thoroughly bad in their planning, and even the Official History should admit as much – and Gough must lump it. He should have been sacked for them without a pension." However, Wynne praised Gough's "gracious" admission that Haig had been wrong to select him to command the offensive, an admission which eventually appeared in the Official History. Another of the writing team, W. B. Wood, wrote (letter undated but probably in December 1944) that Gough "was at last getting his deserts" for having caused "disasters" by "adhering to his own plans for breaking the German lines over the whole of the Fifth Army front in preference to Haig's views".

There was then a further rewrite under the influence of Tavish Davidson, stressing Haig's involvement in the planning of the 31 July attacks. Edmonds ordered a further rewrite, at which point Norman Brook (future Cabinet Secretary) intervened and called a meeting as he felt Edmonds was exercising too much unfettered discretion over the tone of the History. Edmonds' "Reflections" blame Gough for "distant objectives" and ignoring Haig's advice to clear the Gheluveld Plateau first. The final version of the Official History suggests that Edmonds came to agree with Gough that Haig had been pushing for a breakthrough, rather than the limited offensive agreed by the War Cabinet. Edmonds repeatedly mentions how, throughout the Gough and Plumer periods, Haig hoped that the next major blow might cause the disintegration of the German opposition.

Family and final years
Gough’s son Valentine died in infancy shortly after his return from South Africa. He and his wife Mary (known as Daisy) then had four daughters: Myrtle Eleanore born 4 April 1904, Anne born 1906, Joyce born 6 November 1913, and Denise born 26 March 1916. Myrtle married Major Eric Adlhelm Torlogh Dutton, CMG, CBE, in 1936. Gough's wife died in March 1951.

In common with many generals of the era, Gough was a man of strong religious faith.

As late as 5 March 1951 Gough was writing to Edmonds to blame Tavish Davidson and Herbert Lawrence for their lack of influence over Haig's decision-making and claiming that he should have requested an interview with Haig prior to the March 1918 attack, and demanded to hold the bulk of his forces back from the front line, although he doubted that Haig would have agreed to give up ground voluntarily. His long battle for rehabilitation after his unjust dismissal deflected attention from his poor generalship in 1916 and 1917, and by World War Two he had come to be regarded as a military elder statesman. His reputation was also helped by his longevity, and during the revival of interest in the First World War from the late 1950s onwards, he was treated fairly mildly by Alan Clark and A. J. P. Taylor, not least because criticism was so increasingly focussed on Douglas Haig. Gough published another volume of memoirs, Soldiering On, in 1954. The book contains a number of factual errors. In March 1963, shortly before his death, Gough was interviewed on television (the Tonight Programme), using the opportunity to criticise his old nemesis Wilson.

Death
Gough died in London on 18 March 1963 at the age of 92. He suffered from bronchial pneumonia for a month before his death occurred. His body was subsequently cremated at Golders Green Crematorium, the fate of its ashes is publicly unknown.

Assessments
Gough was a man of whom there were extreme opinions; he was the only senior general who regularly visited forward trenches. He was the youngest of the Army Commanders by five years (the next-youngest was Birdwood, who briefly commanded Fifth Army in 1918). F. S. Oliver wrote that Gough brought "something of the nature of religious fervour into his profession". He is often described as having had a "peppery" personality. However, Captain Charles Carrington (Soldiers From the Wars Returning p. 104) recorded that Gough was very civil to him when he encountered him out riding.

Contemporary views
Boraston, in his strongly pro-Haig account (1922), wrote that Gough's performance on the Somme "amply justified the selection of this young but brilliant general" and wrote highly of Gough's performance during the semi-open warfare of early 1917, during the German withdrawal to the Hindenburg Line. Beddington described him as "a great commander" for his performance on the Somme. Liddell Hart (in a letter in 1954) wrote that Gough was "unlucky" to command under stalemate conditions and that in an earlier war, or World War Two, might have been "one of the outstanding figures in military history ... his performance was a lot better than was generally recognised". In the Official History Edmonds argued that under different circumstances Gough might have been a great leader in open warfare like "the late General Patton", and claimed that widespread opinion thought it a pity that an opportunity had been wasted that Gough was not in command of the cavalry at Cambrai.

Sir Charles Bonham-Carter, head of GHQ Training in 1917–18, argued that Gough "had greater qualities than any of the other Army Commanders" and had had the potential to be a great general, but was let down by a poor staff, and was too impatient to realise that infantry attacks needed "time to prepare".

Maj-Gen Sir Richard Bannatine-Allason wrote to Edmonds (in 1931) that Gough's "temperament did not suit him for command" and "found him full of nerves & hunting his subordinates". Simon Robbins suggests that the death of his brother in fighting on the Western Front in early 1915 may well have exacerbated Gough's latter personality traits during the conflict.

Modern historians
Gough's admiring biographer Anthony Farrar-Hockley pointed out that during the Battle of the Somme Gough had captured more difficult ground than Rawlinson, had taken more prisoners (17,723 as opposed to 15,630) but had suffered only half as many casualties (125,531 as opposed to 227,194). Farrar-Hockley also pointed out that not only did Gough not have enough artillery to succeed at Ypres in August 1917, but also argues that the limited advances advocated by "Tavish" Davidson were no cheaper in lives and did not stand any chance of achieving breakthrough or capturing German guns.

Simkins argues that Gough might have been more successful in the semi-open warfare of the Hundred Days. Gough was, in Philpott's view "probably the most discussed and vilified British Western Front general (after Haig at least) ... intelligent, quick witted and charming, a popular man in the army, both confident and courageous" although not popular with subordinates, and was "still learning his trade" in July 1916. However, Philpott concedes that he "interfered far too much" with his subordinates.

Prior & Wilson write of his command record on the Somme: "His grasp of the tactical situation ... seemed always limited, his dithering over the best way to capture Thiepval was disastrous for his troops, and his 'victory' at Beaumont Hamel much over-rated. His performance at the Somme should have seen him sink into a well-deserved obscurity. Perversely, in 1917, the opposite was to happen."

Historians tend to take an equally dim view of Gough's record at Third Ypres. Simpson writes that after the "more or less unsuccessful" operations on 10 and 16 August, Gough "in the end ... decided upon a more or less staggered approach, first one corps attacking and then another, which invited the sort of treatment the Germans had meted out to Fourth Army's piecemeal attacks the previous year. Throughout, though admittedly crippled by the weather, he failed to stick to the principles of careful preparation he had defined at the start of the planning for the offensive. While corps orders were as careful as before, the operations were doomed to fail". John Lee writes that "despite the atrocious rainfall Gough persisted in attacking through August in conditions that led to inevitable defeat and a severe loss of morale among the usually steady and reliable British infantry". Prior & Wilson simply describe Gough's August operations as "abysmal".

Ian Beckett (1999), building on Tim Travers' (1987) concept of a "command vacuum", argues that Gough's failings can in part be attributed to structural failings in the BEF chain of command, as officers grappled with the problems of commanding large formations under stalemate conditions, and the degree of initiative which should be permitted to subordinates. Gary Sheffield does not agree, and argues that before 1918 Gough's "poor performance at Third Ypres" masked the "tactical and operational improvements" which were being made.

Sheffield argues that Gough's overbearing behaviour, especially in 1916, may well have been a need to overcompensate for having been promoted at such a young age, over the heads of jealous colleagues (Gough admitted (The Fifth Army p. 94) that his rapid promotion brought "special difficulties" at Loos), many of whom mistrusted him because of the Curragh Incident. He also argues that Gough "demonstrated a good deal of skill during the March (1918) retreat" and might have come into his own during the advances of the Hundred Days but that his "military vices outweighed his virtues" and "he was not the right man to command an Army on the Somme," although he blames Haig to some extent for not supervising him properly. In Sheffield's view, Archibald Wavell's later observation that Western Front operations were often conducted as "open warfare at the halt" (i.e. seeking to commit reserves to "break the enemy line" as opposed to careful siege operations) certainly applied to Gough's command at the Somme. "His inability to take direction, and his wholehearted and often unjustified confidence in his own planning, led him to overestimate his army's abilities and contributed to his disastrous operations at Bullecourt and Third Ypres". At Third Ypres his performance was "hopelessly optimistic" and "deeply disappointing". "Haig promoted and sustained (Gough) beyond his level of competence" although "arguably, while he deserved dismissal for his handling of the Somme, Bullecourt and Third Ypres, Gough was sacked for the one major battle in which he commanded Fifth Army with some competence".

Les Carlyon concurs that Gough was unfairly dealt with in 1918 but also regards his performance during the Great War in generally unflattering terms, citing documented and repeated failings in planning, preparation, comprehension of the battle space and a lack of empathy with the common soldier.

Fifth Army's "malaise"
Some put the blame for Fifth Army's performance on Gough's Chief of Staff Neill Malcolm, although his overbearing behaviour with Gough's subordinates may have been, even in the view of contemporaries, a variant on the "good-cop/bad-cop" routine. Edmonds also wrote in his memoirs (which are somewhat less reliable than the Official History) that Malcolm "accentuated and encouraged Gough's peculiarities, instead of softening them down" and claimed that in late 1917 Peyton (Military Secretary) had warned Haig "three times that he was not only injuring himself but also injuring the cause by keeping Gough in command" but Haig was "perfectly infatuated with him". The situation worsened after Edward Beddington, who had been something of a buffer, left Fifth Army staff in 1917. Gough, in conversation with Liddell Hart and in The Fifth Army put some blame on Malcolm and also blamed himself for taking Malcolm with him on his inspection rounds, so that officers did not feel able to speak freely. Michael Howard, in his review of Farrar-Hockley's biography, commented that there was more to Fifth Army's "malaise" than that. Sheffield points out that this does not seem to have been Gough's view during the war and that Gough's problems began before Malcolm's arrival (e.g. at Loos) and continued after his removal. Watts of XIX Corps was the biggest victim of Malcolm. Farrar-Hockley argues that Gough was a popular figure until Bullecourt. Wilson's academic biographer Keith Jeffery describes Farrar-Hockley as "an unconvincing defence" of Gough.

Gough was notorious for his "encounters" with subordinates (Brigadier-General Sandilands to Edmonds, 1923). He was "looked on as a bit of a freak" (Brigadier-General Yatman to Edmonds, 1930). By late 1917 "no division wanted to go" to Fifth Army (Liddell Hart 1947) and most units looked on transfer to the Second Army (Plumer) with relief (Liddell Hart 1927). In The Fifth Army Gough acknowledged that there were some who hated coming into the Fifth Army, although he maintained that these were men lacking in boldness, resolution or energy. He wrote to Edmonds (18 March 1944) that "among the senior officers the spirit of energy, of resolution, & of initiative, was lamentably under-developed".

Notes

Further reading 
Books
 
 
 
 Callwell, C.E., Field Marshal Sir Henry Wilson, His Life and Times, Vol. II, London: Cassell, 1927
 
 
 
 
 
 
 
 
 
 
 
 
 
 
 
 
 
 
 
 
 
 
 
 United Kingdom National Archives, Internet Site
 
 

Theses

External links 

 
 National Portrait Gallery
 

|-

|-

|-

1870 births
1963 deaths
People from County Waterford
People educated at Eton College
Graduates of the Royal Military College, Sandhurst
Irish officers in the British Army
Irish generals
Allied intervention in the Russian Civil War
People of Anglo-Irish descent
British Army personnel of the Second Boer War
British Army cavalry generals of World War I
British Home Guard officers
Knights Grand Cross of the Order of the Bath
Knights Grand Cross of the Order of St Michael and St George
Knights Commander of the Royal Victorian Order
British military personnel of the Tirah campaign
16th The Queen's Lancers officers
19th-century Irish people
Irish people of World War I
People of the Estonian War of Independence
Liberal Party (UK) parliamentary candidates
British Army generals
Academics of the Staff College, Camberley
British Army personnel of the Russian Civil War
Military operations of World War I involving chemical weapons
Burials in Surrey
Military personnel from London